= Carbohydrate synthesis =

Sub-field of organic chemistry

Carbohydrate synthesis is a sub-field of organic chemistry concerned with generating complex carbohydrate structures from simple units (monosaccharides). The generation of carbohydrate structures usually involves linking monosaccharides or oligosaccharides through glycosidic bonds, a process called glycosylation. Therefore, it is important to construct glycosidic linkages that have optimum molecular geometry (stereoselectivity) and the stable bond (regioselectivity) at the reaction site (anomeric centre).

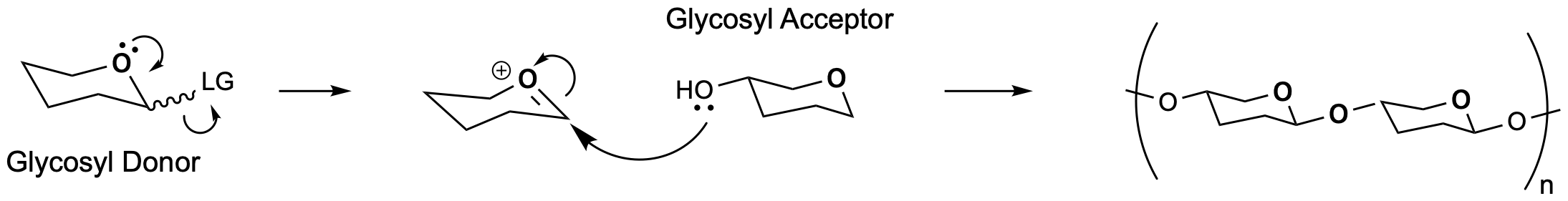
Simplified mechanism of glycosylation

== Background ==
Carbohydrates can generally be classified into one of two groups, monosaccharides, and complex carbohydrates. Monosaccharides (also called "simple sugars") are the simplest single units of any carbohydrate; the most common monosaccharides are five and six carbon compounds such as glucose, fructose, and galactose. Complex carbohydrates are combinations of monosaccharides linked together through connections called glycosidic bonds, the product of these linkages can be further categorized according to their size. Two monosaccharides linked together produce a disaccharide such as lactose. Three to ten monosaccharide units linked together are referred to as oligosaccharides. Anything larger than ten monosaccharide units is called a polysaccharide, this broad category includes very large molecules such as starch, a plant glucose polymer which can contain millions of glucose residues.

The synthesis of carbohydrates is very important to the study of biochemistry and certain kinds of synthetic chemistry since carbohydrates play important roles in many biological systems. In nature, monosaccharides are synthesized biologically from raw materials through the processes of photosynthesis in plants and certain prokaryotes, or by gluconeogenesis in animals.Laboratory processes also exist for the artificial synthesis of monosaccharides, such as the Kiliani-Fischer synthesis which can sequentially build large simple sugars from smaller monomers.

So far, there has not been a unified synthetic strategy of consistent oligosaccharide production because of the nuances in the anomeric effects of monomers and the complexity in the carbohydrate structures. The facile procedures such as the one-pot and solid phase synthesis which ensures atom economy are used. However, further developments in those synthetic approaches are needed since still not fully controlled and automated.

== Significance ==
The glycoconjugate is the product formed by oligosaccharides covalently bonding to other biomolecules such as proteins and lipids. They play indispensable roles in the biological activities of mammalian cells from energy generation to cell signalling. These glycoconjugates with short oligosaccharide structures are important for the characterization and purification in the course glycoconjucate vaccine developments. Therefore, research in the engineering of the glycosyl precursors that create oligosaccharides with controlled size is important in carbohydrate synthesis.

== Biological synthesis ==
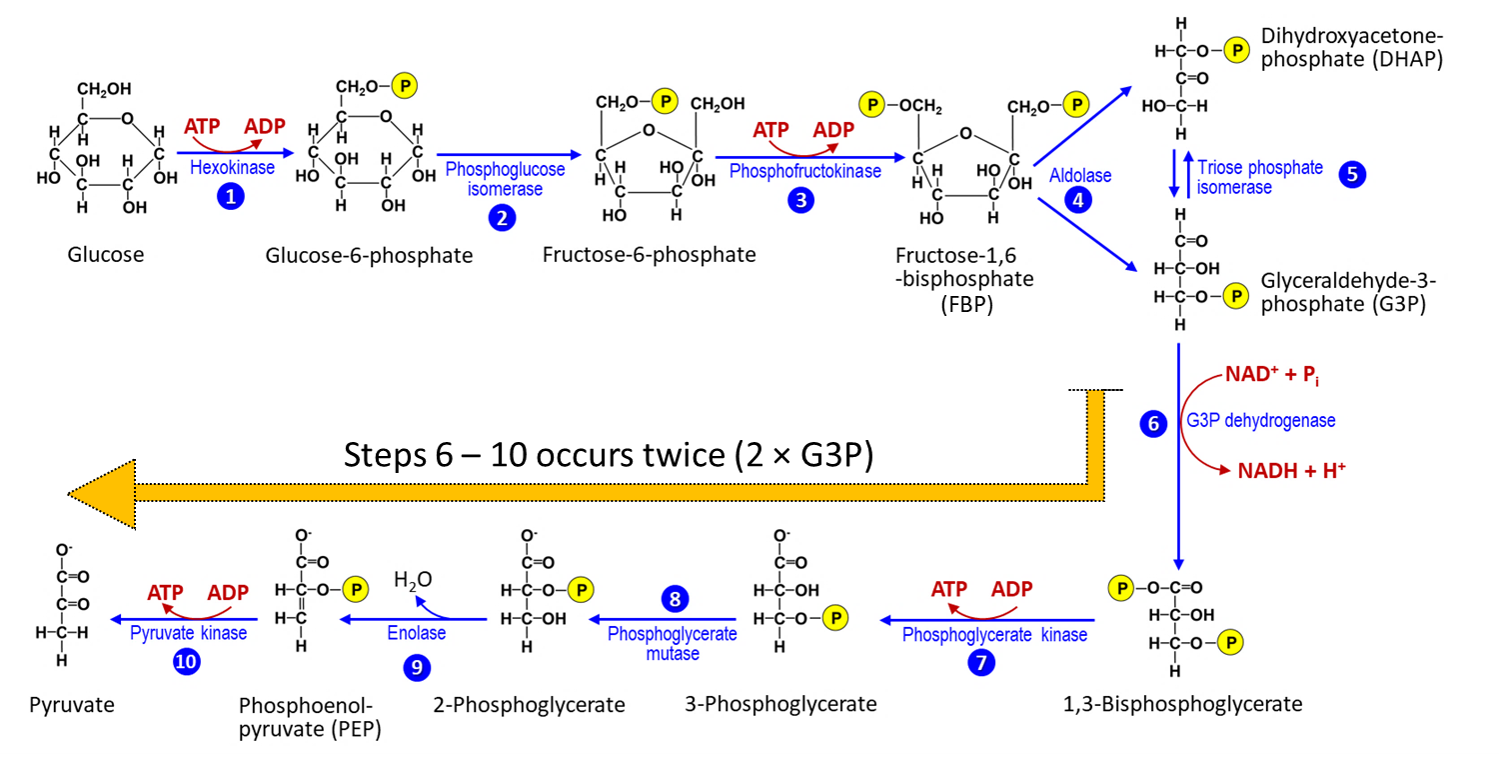
Glycolysis pathway

Mammals begin carbohydrate synthesis with monosaccharides, which come from either gluconeogenesis or the breakdown of complex carbohydrates. Gluconeogenesis begins with pyruvate, which comes from alanine and α-ketoglutarate amino acids. This process only begins when glycogen storages are near depletion due to the higher ATP cost of metabolising proteins into amino acids.

Conversely, plants undergo the Calvin cycle to photosynthesize glucose-3-phosphate from CO_{2} and H_{2}O in the presence of light; the phosphate is quickly hydrolyzed into glucose.

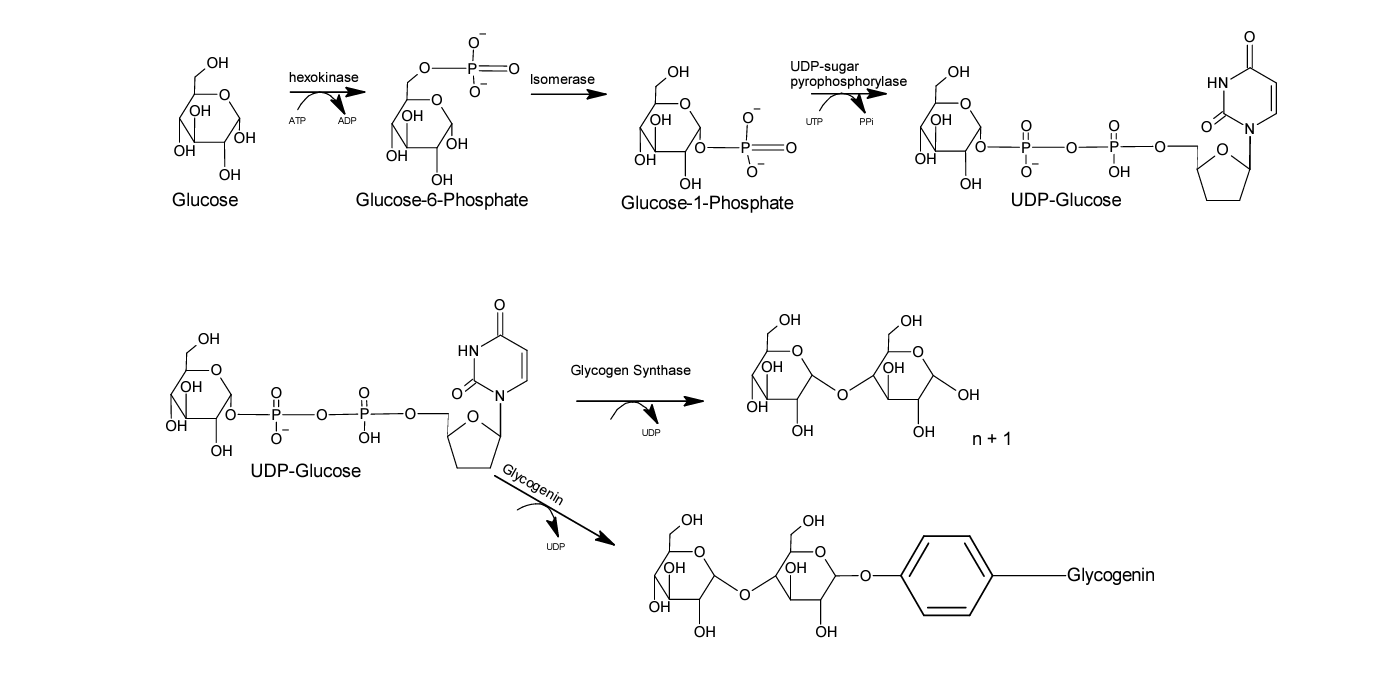
Glucose to glycogen pathway

Digestion of complex carbohydrates allows glucose molecules to be re-polymerized into a form that is recognized by enzymes. In mammals, glucose molecules polymerize into glycogen stores or glycogenin. The reformation of carbohydrates is essential for converting them into forms that can be more easily transported to cells with higher glucose requirements.

Both mammals and plants use the same mechanisms to convert glucose into complex carbohydrates; the only difference is the enzymes used to catalyze the mechanisms. Mammals require glycogen synthase and glycogenin to synthesize glycogen. Plants synthesize amylose with starch synthase and amylopectin with starch-branching enzymes.

== Oligosaccharide synthesis ==
Oligosaccharides have diverse structures. The number of monosaccharides, ring size, the different anomeric stereochemistry, and the existence of the branched-chain sugars all contribute to the amazing complexity of the oligosaccharide structures. The essence of the reducing oligosaccharide synthesis is connecting the anomeric hydroxyl of the glycosyl donors to the alcoholic hydroxyl groups of the glycosyl acceptors. Protection of the hydroxyl groups of the acceptor with the target alcoholic hydroxyl group unprotected can assure regiochemical control. Additionally, factors such as the different protecting groups, the solvent, and the glycosylation methods can influence which anomer is formed.

=== Building blocks ===
Common donors in oligosaccharide synthesis are glycosyl halides, glycosyl acetates, thioglycosides, trichloroacetimidates, pentenyl glycosides, and glycals. Of all these donors, glycosyl halides are classic donors, which played a historical role in the development of glycosylation reactions. Thioglycoside and trichloroacetimidate donors are used more than others in contemporary glycosylation methods. When it comes to the trichloroacetimidate method, one of the advantages is that there is no need to introduce heavy metal reagents in the activation process. Moreover, using different bases can selectively lead to different anomeric configurations. (Scheme 2) As to the thioglycosides, the greatest strength is that they can offer temporary protection to the anomeric centre because they can survive after most of the activation processes. Additionally, a variety of activation methods can be employed, such as NIS/ AgOTf, NIS/ TfOH, IDCP (iodine dicollidine perchlorate), iodine, and Ph_{2}SO/ Tf_{2}O. Furthermore, in the preparation of 1, 2-trans glycosidic linkage, using thioglycosides and imidates can promote the rearrangement of the orthoester byproducts, since the reaction mixtures are acidic enough.

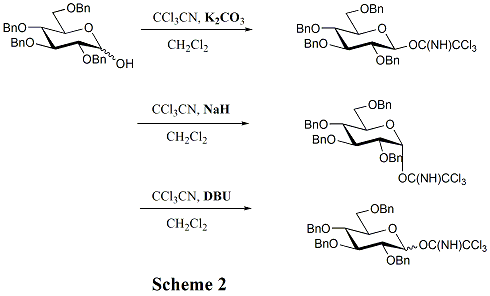

=== Stereoselectivity ===
The structures of acceptors play a critical role in the rate and stereoselectivity of glycosylations. Generally, the unprotected hydroxyl groups are less reactive when they are between bulky protecting groups. That is the reason why the hydroxyl group at OH-4 in pyranosides is unreactive. Hyperconjugation is involved when OH-4 is anti-periplanar to the ring oxygen, which can also reduce its reactivity. (Scheme 3) Furthermore, acyl protecting groups can reduce the reactivity of the acceptors compared with alkyl protecting groups because of their electron-withdrawing ability. Hydroxyl group at OH-4 of N-acetylglucosamine derivatives is particularly unreactive.

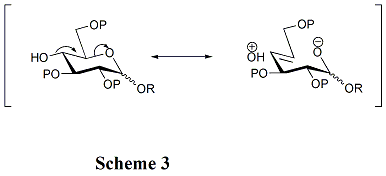

The glycosidic bond is formed from a glycosyl donor and a glycosyl acceptor. There are four types of glycosidic linkages: 1, 2-trans-α, 1, 2-trans-beta, 1, 2-cis-α, and 1, 2-cis-beta linkages. 1, 2-trans glycosidic linkages can be easily achieved by using 2-O-acylated glycosyl donors (neighboring group participation). To prevent the accumulation of the orthoester intermediates, the glycosylation condition should be slightly acidic.

=== Challenging linkages ===
When connecting the monosaccharides, the oligosaccharides need to be reducing in order to sequentially connect the glycosyl units. The monosaccharides, in nature prefer ɑ-linkages due to anomeric effect, but the disaccharides with ɑ-linkages are non-reducing thus deactivating the consequent connection of the monosaccharides. In order to make the process of glycosylation continuous and automated, the glycosidic linkages must maintain beta so to keep the structure open to coupling with more glycosyl groups.

It is somewhat more difficult to prepare 1, 2-cis-β-glycosidic linkages stereoselectively. Typically, when non-participating groups on O-2 position, 1, 2-cis-β-linkage can be achieved either by using the historically important halide ion methods, or by using 2-O-alkylated glycosyl donors, commonly thioglycosides or trichloroacetimidates, in nonpolar solvents.

In the early 1990s, it was still the case that the beta mannoside linkage was too challenging to be attempted by amateurs. However, the method introduced by David Crich (Scheme 4), with 4,6-benzylidene protection a prerequisite and anomeric alpha triflate a key intermediate leaves this problem essentially solved. The concurrently developed but rather more protracted intramolecular aglycon delivery (IAD) approach is a little-used but nevertheless stereospecific alternative.

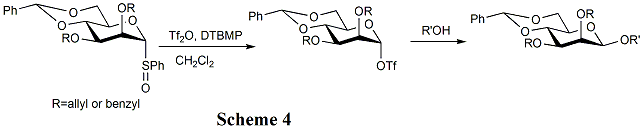

== See also ==
Common reactions for glycosidic bond formation are as follows:

- Chemical glycosylation
- Fischer glycosidation
- Koenigs-Knorr reaction
- Crich beta-mannosylation

Some common protection methods are as below:

- Carbohydrate acetalisation
- Trimethylsilyl
- Benzyl ether
- p-Methoxybenzyl ether
