= Intramolecular aglycon delivery =

Stereospecific glycosylation technique in organic carbohydrate chemistry

Intramolecular aglycon delivery is a synthetic strategy for the construction of glycans. This approach is generally used for the formation of difficult glycosidic linkages.

== Introduction ==
Glycosylation reactions are very important reactions in carbohydrate chemistry, leading to the synthesis of oligosaccharides, preferably in a stereoselective manner. The stereoselectivity of these reactions has been shown to be affected by both the nature and the configuration of the protecting group at C-2 on the glycosyl donor ring. While 1,2-trans-glycosides (e.g. α-mannosides and β-glucosides) can be synthesised easily in the presence of a participating group (such as OAc, or NHAc) at the C-2 position in the glycosyl donor ring, 1,2-cis-glycosides are more difficult to prepare. 1,2-cis-glycosides with the α configuration (e.g. glucosides or galactosides) can often be prepared using a non-participating protecting group (such as Bn, or All) on the C-2 hydroxy group. However, 1,2-cis-glycosides with the β configuration are the most difficult to achieve, and present the greatest challenge in glycosylation reactions.

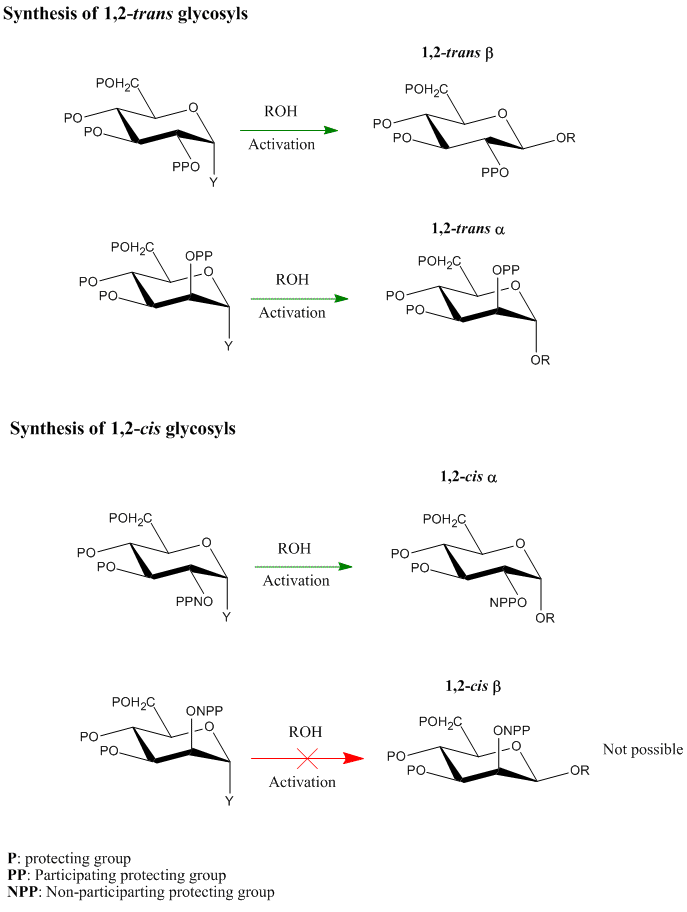

One of the most recent approaches to prepare 1,2-cis-β-glycosides in a stereospecific manner is termed ‘Intramolecular Aglycon Delivery’, and various methods have been developed based on this approach. In this approach, the glycosyl acceptor is tethered onto the C-2-O-protecting group (X) in the first step. Upon activation of the glycosyl donor group (Y) (usually SR, OAc, or Br group) in the next step, the tethered aglycon traps the developing oxocarbenium ion at C-1, and is transferred from the same face as OH-2, forming the glycosidic bond stereospecifically. The yield of this reaction drops as the bulkiness of the alcohol increases.

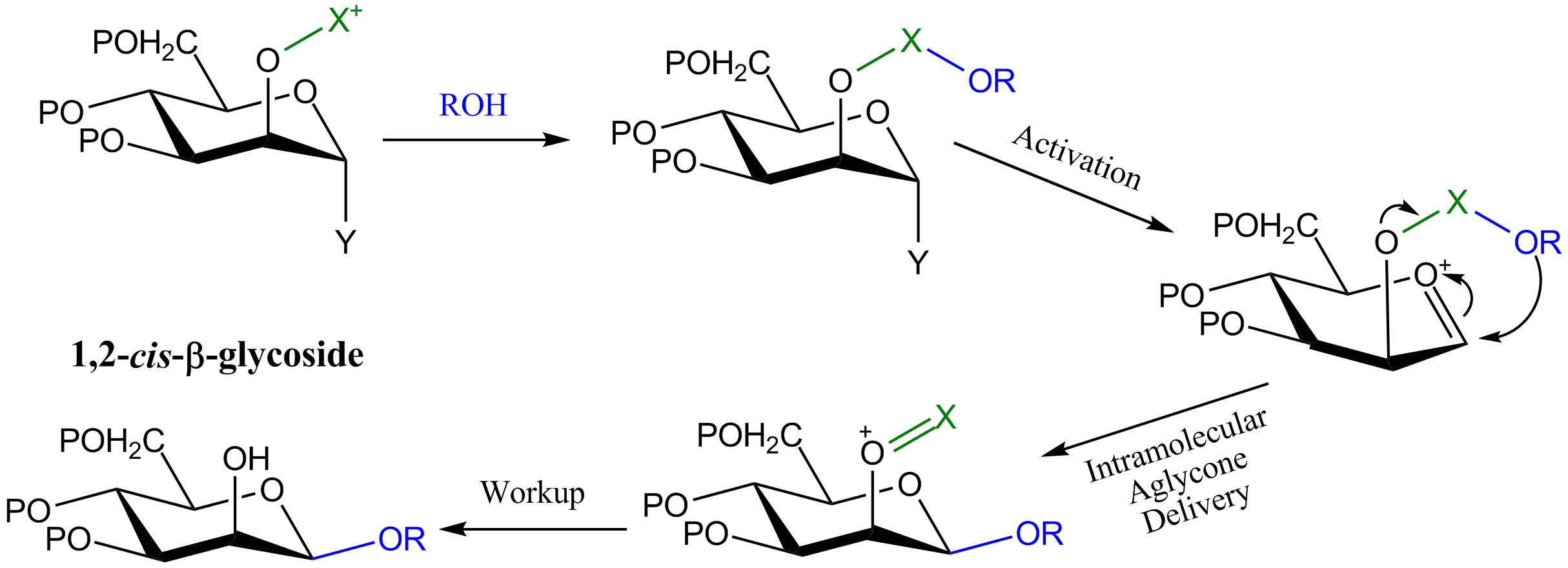

== Intramolecular Aglycon Delivery (IAD) methods ==
=== Carbon tethering ===
==== Acid-catalysed tethering to enol ethers ====
In this method, the glycosyl donor is protected at the C-2 position by an OAc group. The C-2-OAc protecting group is transformed into an enol ether by the Tebbe reagent (Cp_{2}Ti=CH_{2}), and then the glycosyl acceptor is tethered to the enol ether under acid-catalysed conditions to generate a mixed acetal. In a subsequent step, the β-mannoside is formed upon activation of the anomeric leaving group (Y), followed by work up.

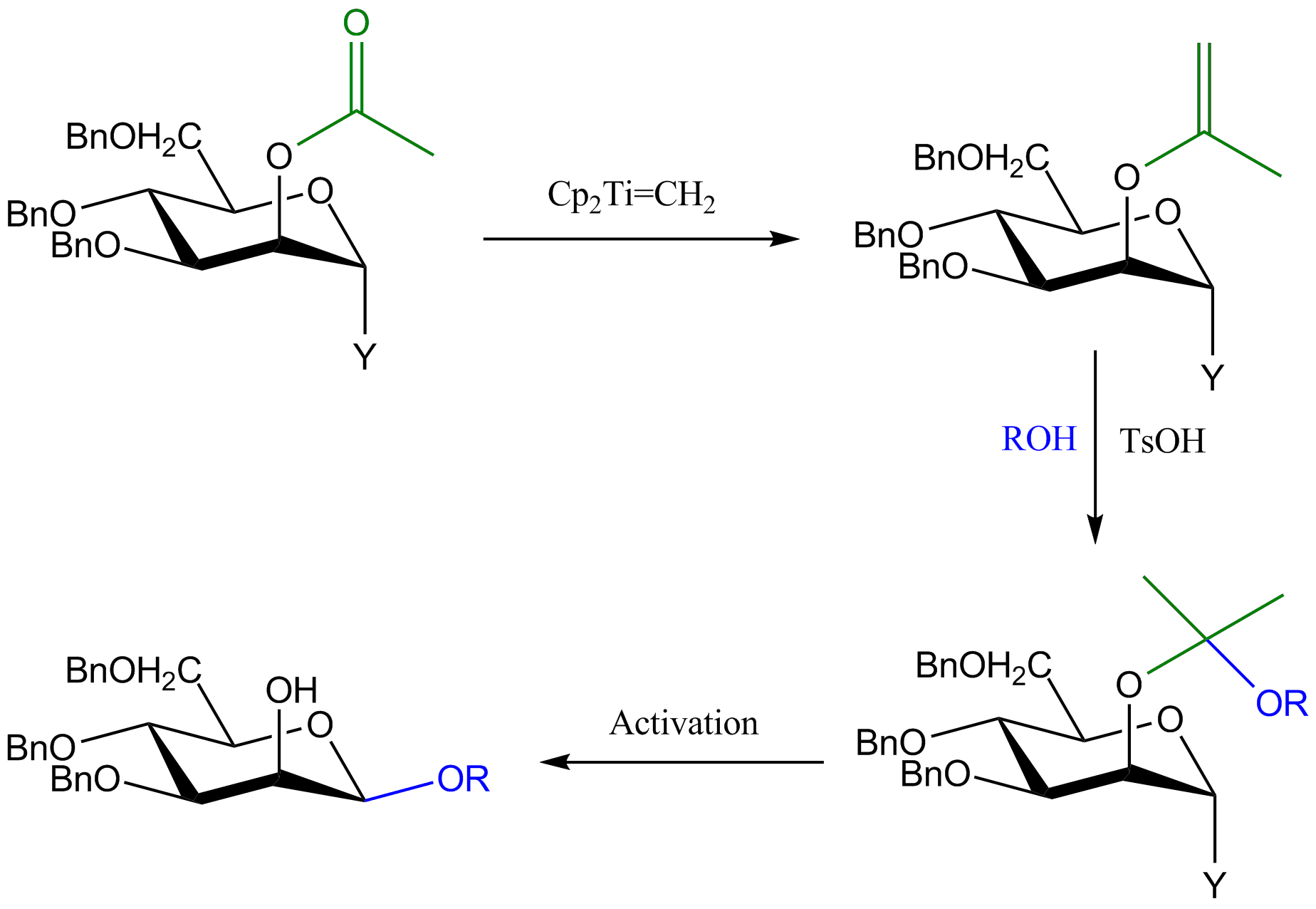

==== Iodonium tethering to enol ethers ====
This method is similar to the previous method in that the glycosyl donor is protected at C-2 by an OAc group, which is converted into an enol ether by the Tebbe reagent. However, in this approach, N-iodosuccinimide (NIS) is used to tether the glycosyl acceptor to the enol ether, and in a second step, activation of the anomeric leaving group leads to intramolecular delivery of the aglycon to C-1 and formation of the 1,2-cis-glycoside product.

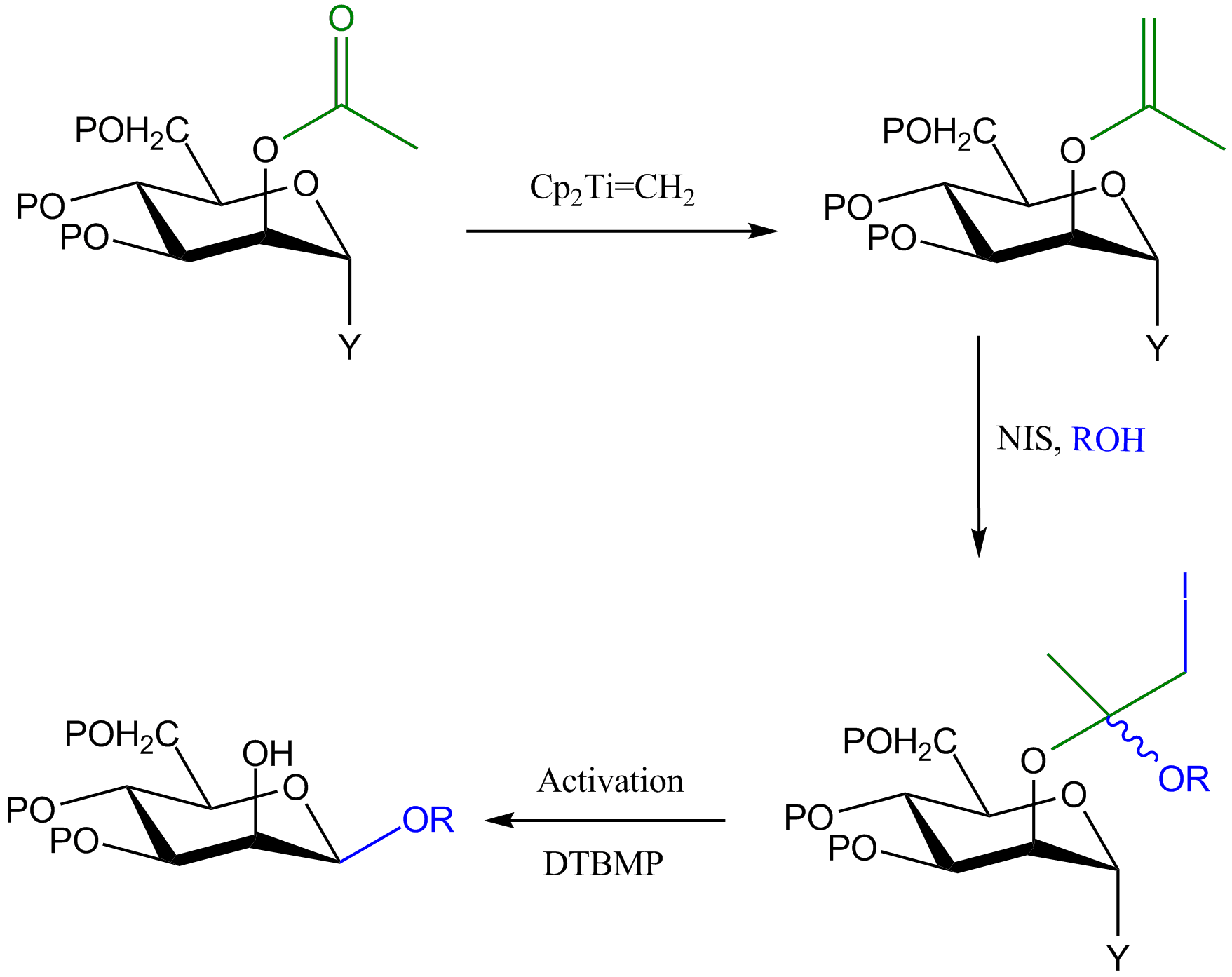

==== Iodonium tethering to prop-1-enyl ethers ====
The glycosyl donor is protected at C-2 by OAll group. The allyl group is then isomerized to a prop-1-enyl ether using a rhodium hydride generated from Wilkinson's catalyst ((PPh_{3})_{3}RhCl) and butyllithium (BuLi). The resulting enol ether is then treated with NIS and the glycosyl acceptor to generate a mixed acetal. The 1,2-cis (e.g. β-mannosyl) product is formed in a final step through activation of the anomeric leaving group, delivery of the aglycon from the mixed acetal and finally hydrolytic work-up to remove the remains of the propenyl ether from O-2.

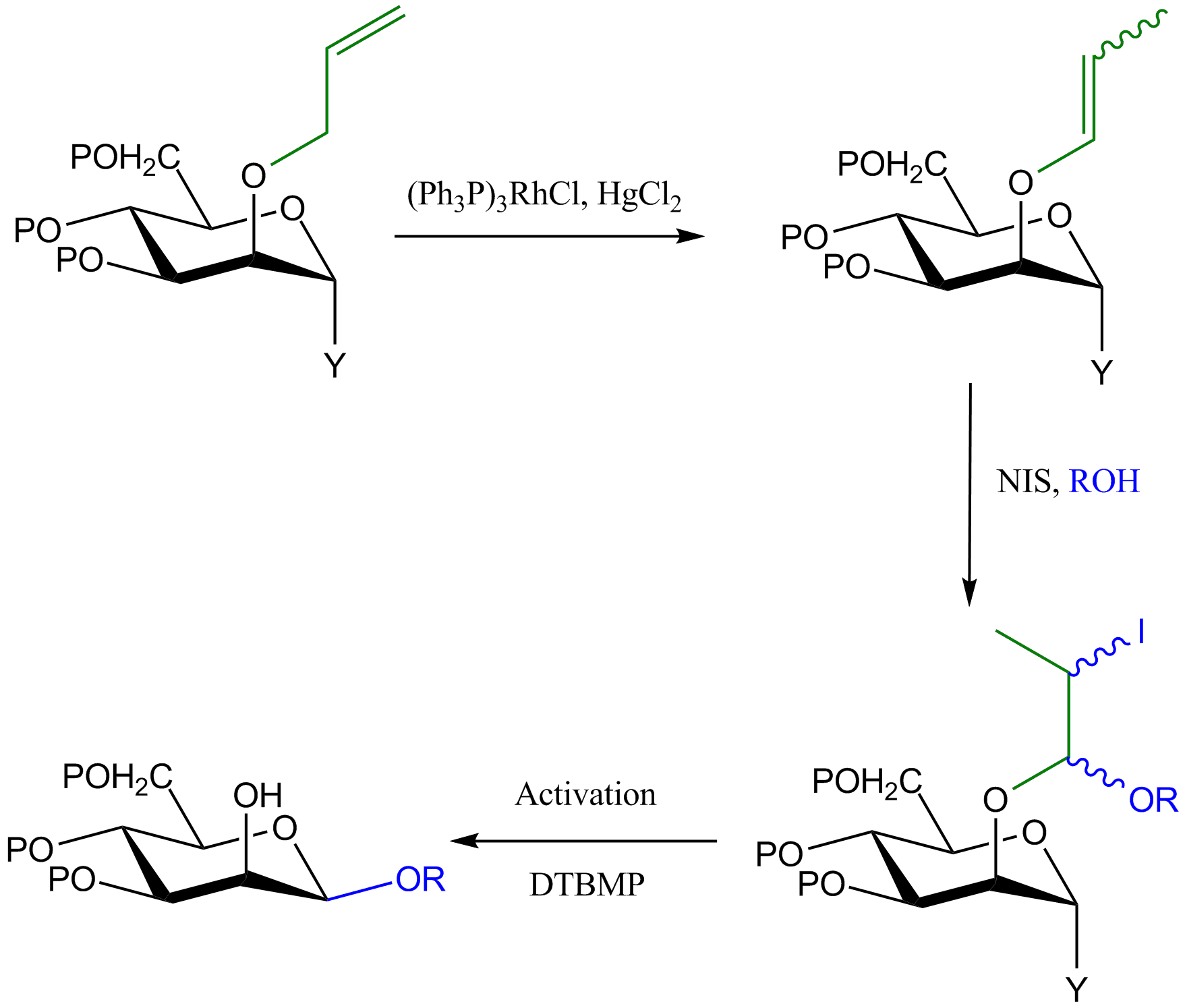

==== Oxidative tethering to para-methoxybenzyl (PMB) ethers ====
In this method, the glycosyl donor is protected at C-2 by a para-methoxybenzyl (PMB) group. The glycosyl acceptor is then tethered at the benzylic position of the PMB protecting group in the presence of 2,3-Dichloro-5,6-dicyano-1,4-benzoquinone (DDQ). The anomeric leaving group (Y) is then activated, and the developing oxocarbenium ion is captured by the tethered aglycon alcohol (OR) to give 1,2-cis β-glycoside product.

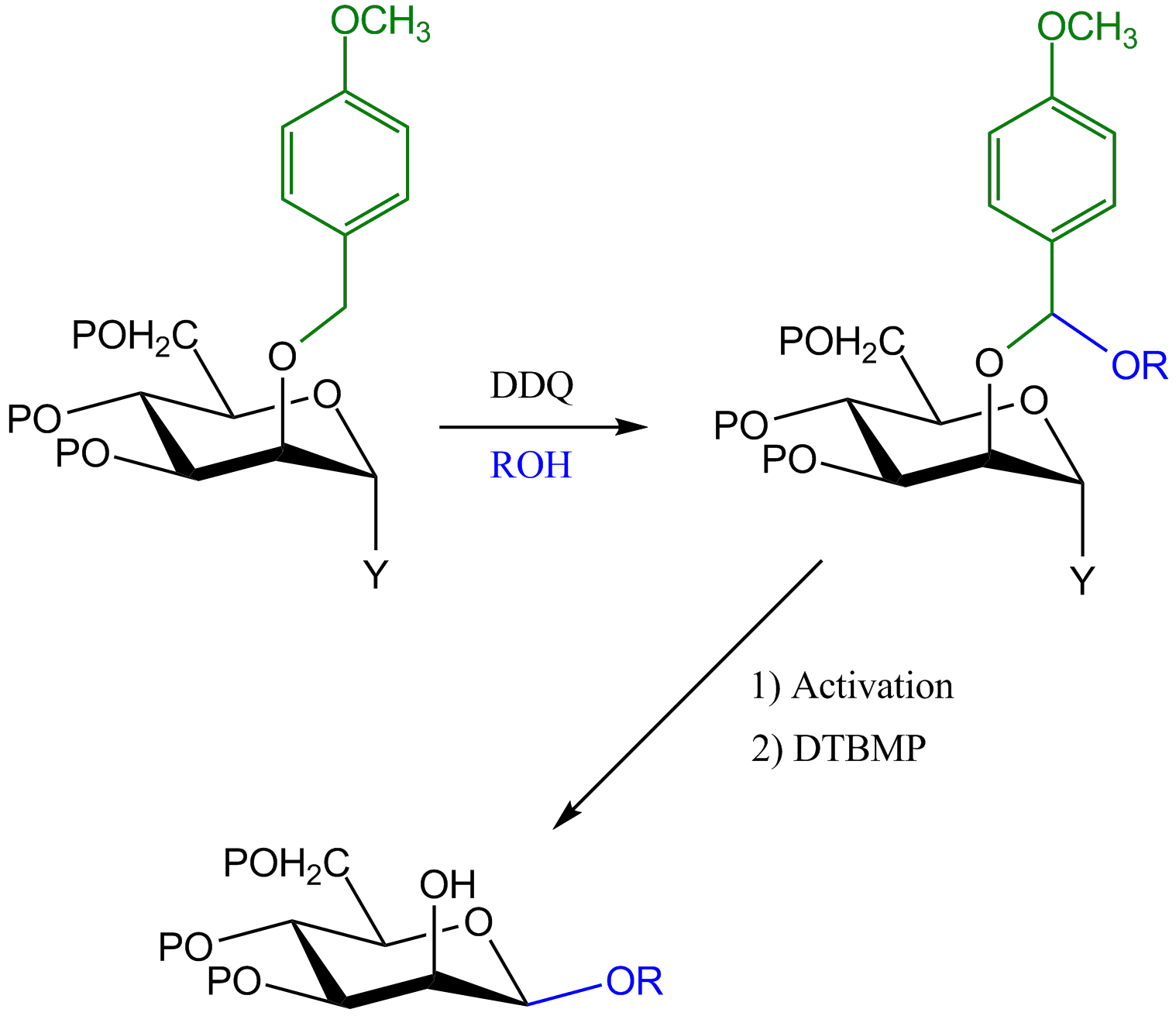

==== Solid-supported oxidative tethering to para-alkoxybenzyl ethers ====
This is a modification of the method of oxidative tethering to a para-methoxybenzyl ether. The difference here is that the para-alkoxybenzyl group is attached to a solid support; the β-mannoside product is released into the solution phase in the last step, while the by-products remain attached to the solid phase. This makes the purification of the β-glycoside easier; it is formed as the almost exclusive product.

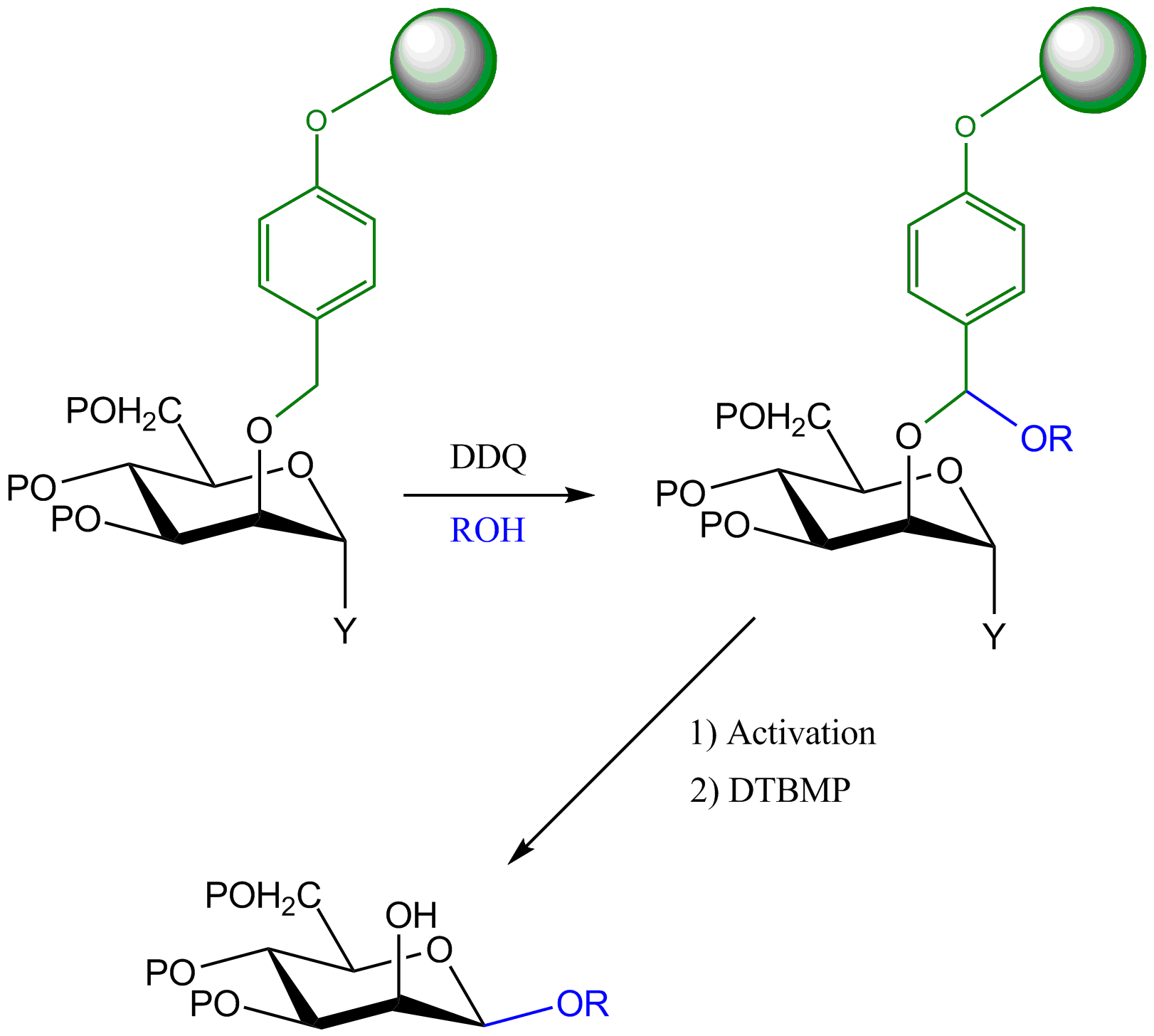

=== Silicon tethering ===
The initial step in this method involves the formation of a silyl ether at the C-2 hydroxy group of the glycosyl donor upon addition of dimethyldichlorosilane in the presence of a strong base such as butyllithium (BuLi); then the glycosyl acceptor is added to form a mixed silaketal. Activation of the anomeric leaving group in the presence of a hindered base then leads to the β-glycoside.

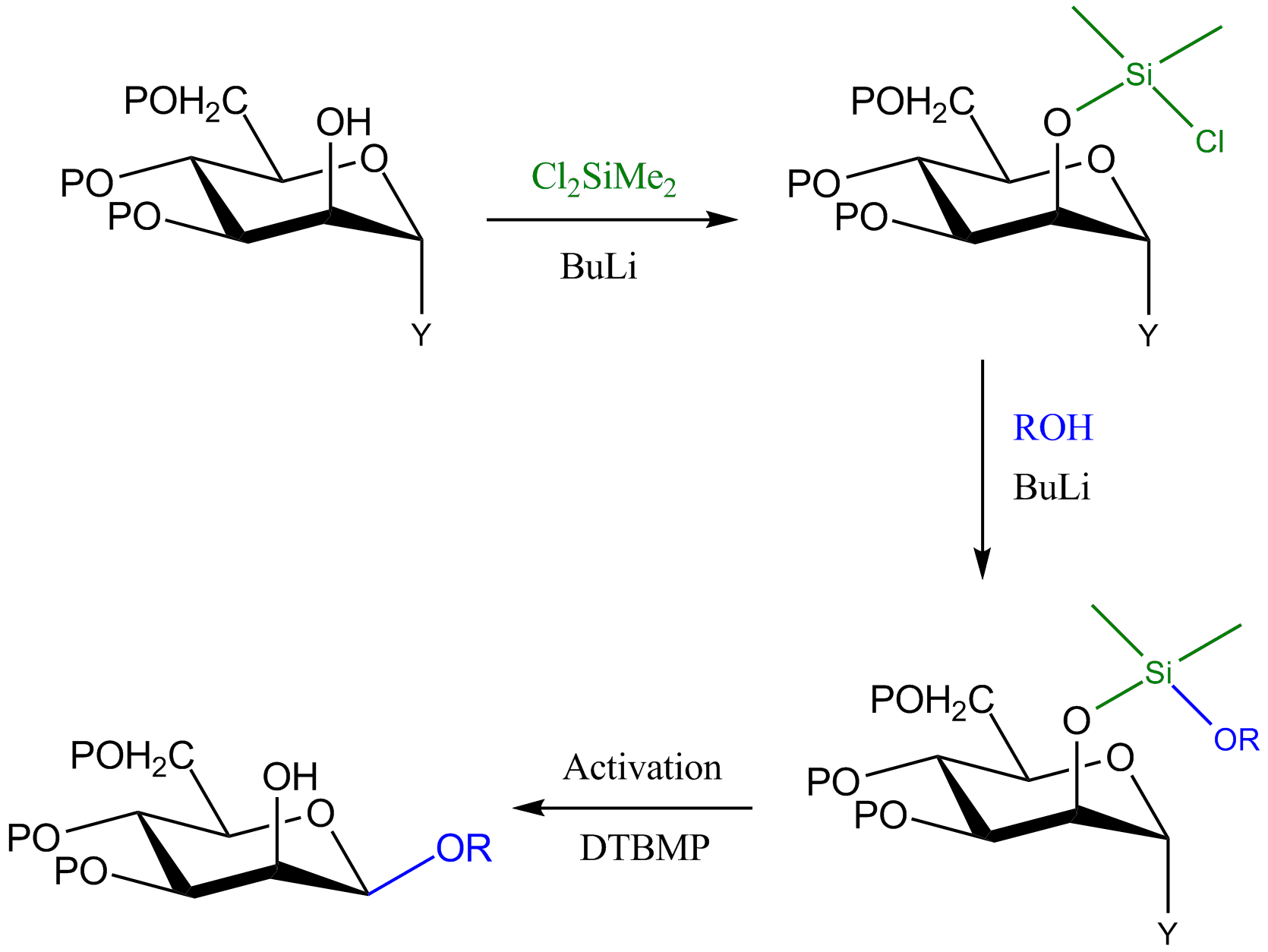

A modified silicon-tethering method involves mixing of the glycosyl donor with the glycosyl acceptor and dimethyldichlorosilane in the presence of imidazole to give the mixed silaketal in one pot. Activation of the tethered intermediate then leads to the β-glycoside product.

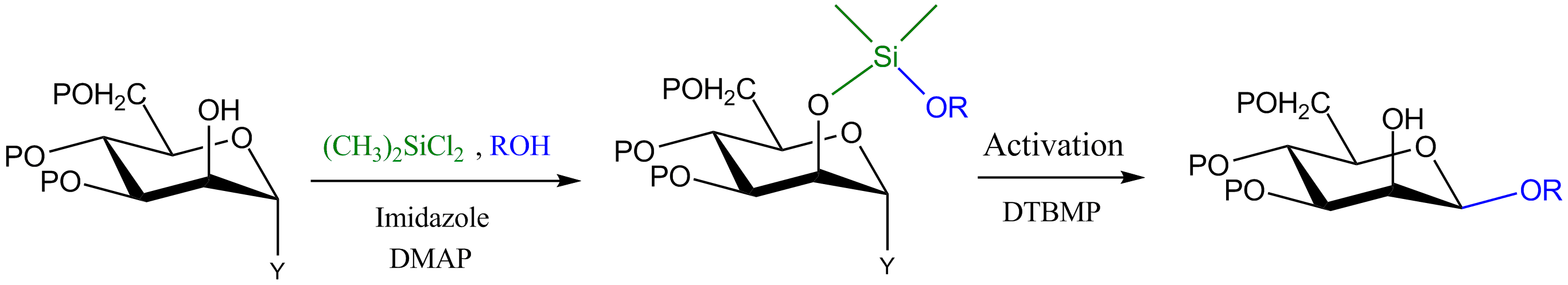

== See also ==
- Chemical glycosylation
- Glycosyl halide
