= Helferich method =

The Helferich method may refer to:

- Glycosylation of an alcohol using a glycosyl acetate as glycosyl donor and a Lewis acid (e.g. a metal halide) as promoter
- Glycosylation of an alcohol using a glycosyl halide as a glycosyl donor and a mercury salt as promoter (cf the Koenigs-Knorr reaction, which uses silver salts as promoters)
