= Carboximidate =

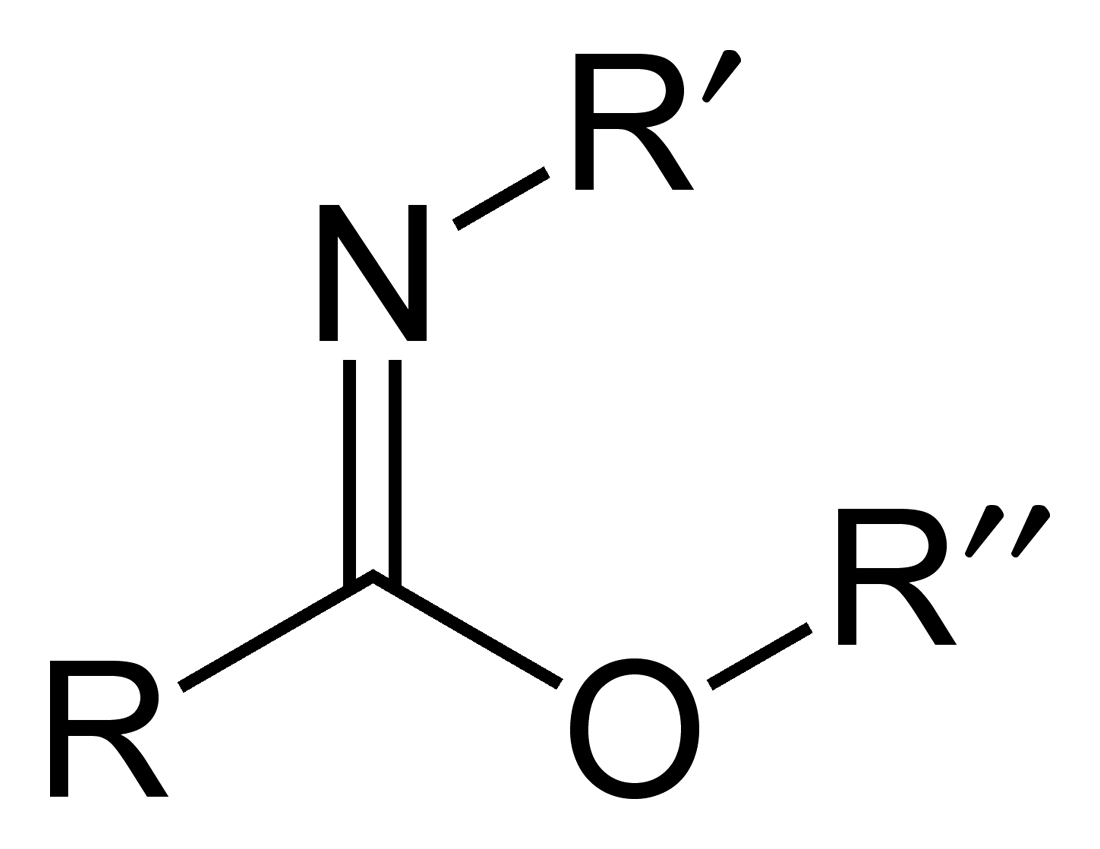
The carboximidate group

Carboximidates (or more general imidates) are organic compounds, which can be thought of as esters formed between an imidic acid (R−C(=NR′)OH) and an alcohol, with the general formula R−C(=NR′)OR″.

They are also known as imino ethers, since they resemble imines (>C=N−) with an oxygen atom connected to the carbon atom of the C=N double bond.

== Synthesis ==
Imidates may be generated by a number of synthetic routes, but are in general formed by the Pinner reaction. This proceeds via the acid catalyzed attack of nitriles by alcohols.

General mechanism of the Pinner reaction

Imidates produced in this manner are formed as their hydrochloride salts, which are sometimes referred to as Pinner salts. Carboximidates are also formed as intermediates in the Mumm rearrangement and the Overman rearrangement.

== Imidate/amidate anions ==
An amidate/imidate anion is formed upon deprotonation of an amide or imidic acid. Since amides and imidic acids are tautomers, they form the same anion upon deprotonation. The two names are thus synonyms describing the same anion, although arguably, imidate refers to the resonance contributor on the left, while amidate refers to the resonance contributor on the right. However, they are distinguished when they act as ligands for transition metals, with O-bound species referred to as imidates and N-bound species referred to as amidates. They can be considered aza-substituted analogues of enolates with the formula R-N=C(O^{−})R.

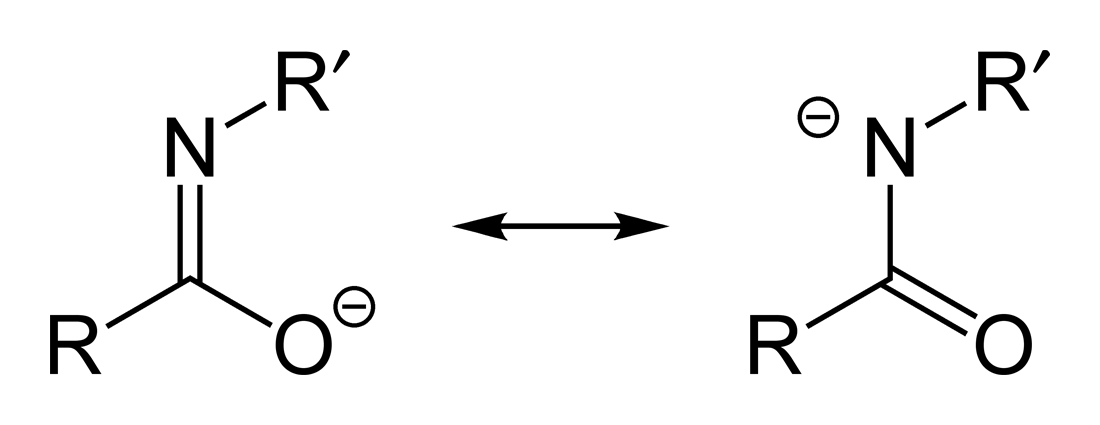
Imidate/amidate resonance

== Reactions ==
Carboximidates are good electrophiles and undergo a range of addition reactions; with aliphatic imidates generally reacting faster than aromatic imidates. They can be hydrolyzed to give esters and by an analogous process react with amines (including ammonia) to form amidines. Aliphatic imidates react with an excess of alcohol under acid catalysis to form orthoesters RC(OR)_{3}; aromatic imidates can also be converted but far less readily.

=== Chapman rearrangement ===
The Chapman rearrangement is the thermal conversion of aryl N-arylbenzimidates to the corresponding amides, via intramolecular migration of an aryl group from oxygen to nitrogen. It is named after Arthur William Chapman, who first described it, and is conceptually similar to the Newman–Kwart rearrangement.

Chapman Rearrangement

=== As a protecting group ===
Benzyl trichloroethanimidate

Carboximidates can act as protecting group for alcohols. For example, the base catalyzed reaction of benzyl alcohol upon trichloroacetonitrile yields a trichloroacetimidate. This species has orthogonal stability to acetate and TBS protections and may be cleaved by acid hydrolysis.

== See also ==
- Amidines
- Esters
- Imidoyl chloride — the "acyl chloride" variant
- Oxazoline — the corresponding 5-membered heterocycle
