= Trichloroacetimidate =

Type of organochlorine compound

Trichloroacetimidates (right) are addition reaction products of trichloroacetonitrile and alcohols.

A trichloroacetimidate is a type of organochlorine compound. It is the product of the addition reaction between an alcohol and trichloroacetonitrile. O-Glycosyl-trichloroacetimidates are of particular interest as glycosyl donors for chemical glycosylation. They were first introduced and explored by German chemist R. R. Schmidt in 1980 and since then have become very popular for glycoside synthesis. The use of trichloroacetimidates provides many advantages including ease of formation, reactivity and stereochemical outcome.

== Synthesis ==
O-Glycosyl trichloroacetimidates are prepared via the addition of trichloroacetonitrile (Cl_{3}CCN) under basic conditions to a free anomeric hydroxyl group. Under kinetic control with potassium carbonate as the base, β-trichloroacetimidates are formed selectively, whereas with sodium hydride, caesium carbonate or potassium hydroxide and in the presence of phase-transfer catalysts only α-trichloroacetimidates are obtained (thermodynamically controlled).

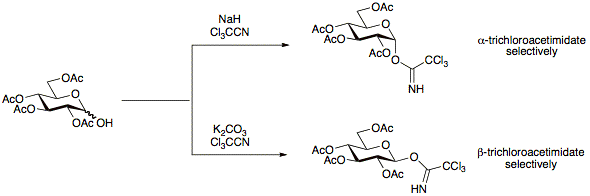

== Use in glycosylation reactions ==
The trichloroacetimidates are reacted between −40 °C and room temperature with boron trifluoride etherate in dichloromethane with O-protected sugars. This method usually gives better results than the Koenigs–Knorr method using silver salts or the Helferich method which uses problematic mercury salts. Since an inversion occurs at the anomeric center, the reaction leads to β-O-glycosides (when using α-trichloroacetimidates). The trichloroacetimidate method often produces sterically uniform glycosides under mild reaction conditions in very good yields.

Octaacetyltrehalose

Thioacetic acid reacts with acetyl-protected α-galactosyl trichloroacetimidate even without additional acid catalysis to thioglycoside, from which (after cleavage of the protective groups) 1-thio-β-D-galactose is easily accessible, which is useful for the separation of racemates of amino acids.

Thiogalactose synthesis

Typical activating groups for glycosylation reactions using trichloroacetimidates are BF_{3}•OEt_{2} or TMSOTf.

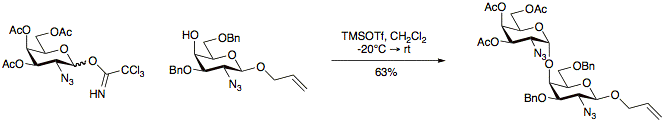

Column chromatographic purification of the reaction mixture can sometimes be challenging due to the trichloroacetamide by-product. This can, however, be overcome by washing the organic layer with 1 M NaOH solution in a separatory funnel prior to chromatography. Acetyl protecting groups were found to be stable during this procedure.

Glycosyl trichloroacetimidates can rearrange to glycosyl chlorides in response to UV light.
