= Oxocarbenium =

Charged chemical group of the form >CO–

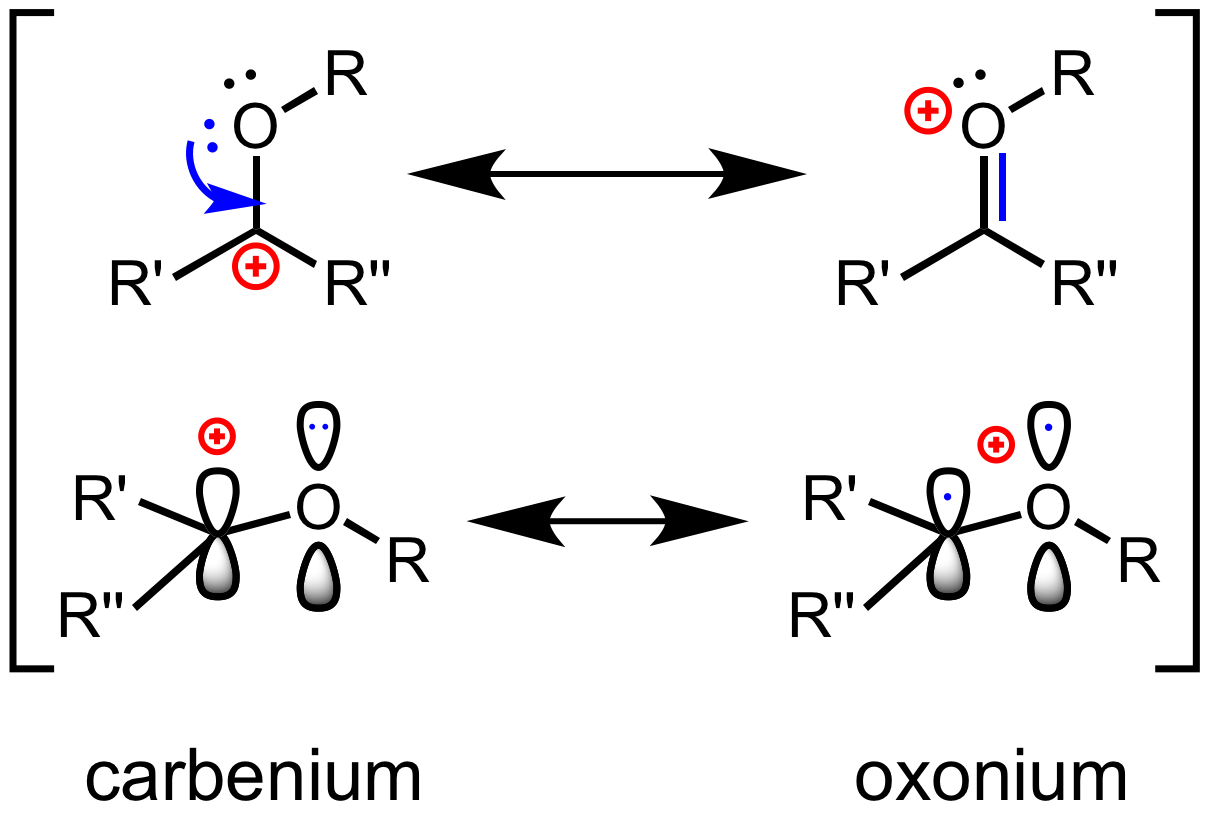
The general structure of an oxocarbenium ion

In organic chemistry, an oxocarbenium ion (alternatively spelled oxacarbenium) is a chemical species characterized by a central sp^{2}-hybridized atom of carbon, a substituent atom of oxygen, and an overall positive charge that is delocalized between the central carbon and oxygen atoms (R_{2}[CO]^{+}R). An oxocarbenium ion is represented by two limiting resonance structures, one in the form of a carbenium ion with the positive charge on carbon (>C^{+}−O−) and the other in the form of an oxonium species with the formal charge on oxygen (>C=O^{+}−). As a resonance hybrid, the true structure falls between the two.

Compared to neutral carbonyl (C=O) compounds like ketones (>C=O) or esters, the carbenium ion form is a larger contributor to the structure. They are common reactive intermediates in the hydrolysis of glycosidic bonds, and are a commonly used strategy for chemical glycosylation. These ions have since been proposed as reactive intermediates in a wide range of chemical transformations, and have been utilized in the total synthesis of several natural products. In addition, they commonly appear in mechanisms of enzyme-catalyzed biosynthesis and hydrolysis of carbohydrates in nature. Anthocyanins are natural flavylium dyes, which are stabilized oxocarbenium compounds. Anthocyanins are responsible for the colors of a wide variety of common flowers such as pansies and edible plants such as eggplant and blueberry.

== Electron distribution and reactivity ==
The best Lewis structure for an oxocarbenium ion contains an oxygen–carbon double bond, with the oxygen atom attached to an additional group and consequently taking on a formal positive charge. In the language of canonical structures (or "resonance"), the polarization of the π bond is described by a secondary carbocationic resonance form, with a formal positive charge on carbon (see above). In terms of frontier molecular orbital theory, the Lowest Unoccupied Molecular Orbital (LUMO) of the oxocarbenium ion is a π* orbital that has the large lobe on the carbon atom; the more electronegative oxygen contributes less to the LUMO. Consequently, in an event of a nucleophilic attack, the carbon is the electrophilic site. Compared to a ketone, the polarization of an oxocarbenium ion is accentuated: they more strongly resemble a "true" carbocation, and they are more reactive toward nucleophiles. In organic reactions, ketones are commonly activated by the coordination of a Lewis acid or Brønsted acid to the oxygen to generate an oxocarbenium ion as an intermediate.

Numerically, a typical partial charge (derived from Hartree-Fock computations) for the carbonyl carbon of a ketone R_{2}C=O (like acetone) is δ+ = 0.51. With the addition of an acidic hydrogen to the oxygen atom to produce [R_{2}C=OH]^{+}, the partial charge increases to δ+ = 0.61. In comparison, the nitrogen analogues of ketones and oxocarbenium ions, imines (R_{2}C=NR) and iminium ions ([R_{2}C=NRH]^{+}), respectively, have partial charges of δ+ = 0.33 and δ+ = 0.54, respectively. The order of partial positive charge on the carbonyl carbon is therefore imine < ketone < iminium < oxocarbenium.

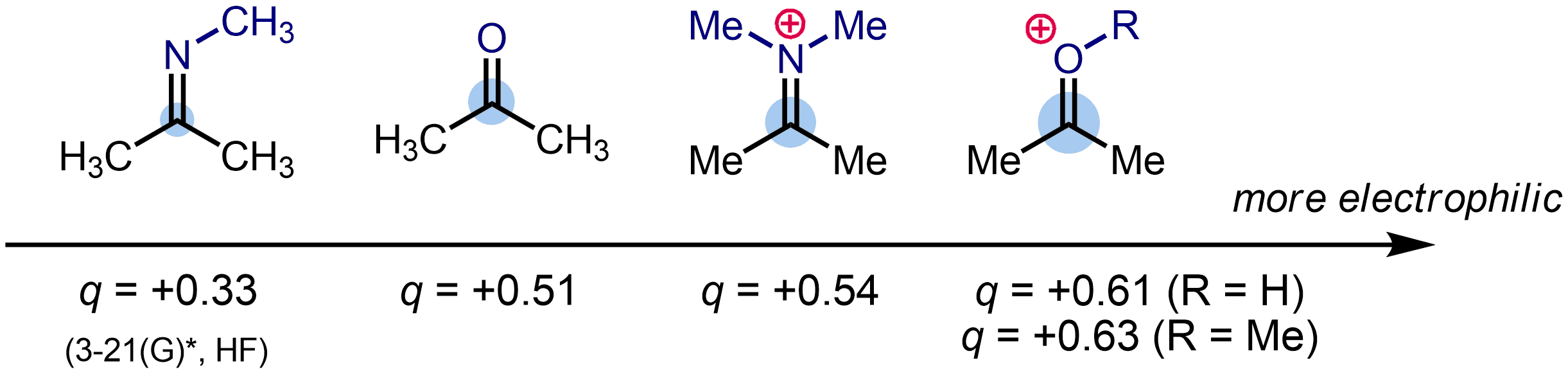

This is also the order of electrophilicity for species containing C=X (X = O, NR) bonds. This order is synthetically significant and explains, for example, why reductive aminations are often best carried out at pH = 5 to 6 using sodium cyanoborohydride (Na^{+}[H_{3}B(CN)]^{−}) or sodium triacetoxyborohydride (Na^{+}[HB(OAc)_{3}]^{−}) as a reagent. Bearing an electron-withdrawing group, sodium cyanoborohydride and sodium triacetoxyborohydride are poorer reducing agents than sodium borohydride, and their direct reaction with ketones is generally a slow and inefficient process. However, the iminium ion (but not the imine itself) formed in situ during a reductive amination reaction is a stronger electrophile than the ketone starting material and will react with the hydride source at a synthetically useful rate. Importantly, the reaction is conducted under mildly acidic conditions that protonate the imine intermediate to a significant extent, forming the iminium ion, while not being strongly acidic enough to protonate the ketone, which would form the even more electrophilic oxocarbenium ion. Thus, the reaction conditions and reagent ensure that amine is formed selectively from iminium reduction, instead of direct reduction of the carbonyl group (or its protonated form) to form an alcohol.

== Formation ==
Formation of oxocarbenium ions can proceed through several different pathways. Most commonly, the oxygen of a ketone will bind to a Lewis Acid, which activates the ketone, making it a more effective electrophile. The Lewis acid can be a wide range of molecules, from a simple hydrogen atom to metal complexes. The remainder of this article will focus on alkyl oxocarbenium ions, however, where the atom added to the oxygen is a carbon. One way that this sort of ion will form is the elimination of a leaving group. In carbohydrate chemistry, this leaving group is often an ether or ester. An alternative to elimination is direct deprotonation of the molecule to form the ion, however, this can be difficult and require strong bases to achieve.

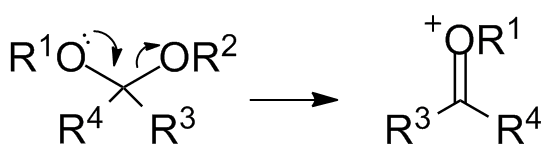
The formation of an oxocarbenium ion

== Applications to synthesis ==
=== 5-membered rings ===
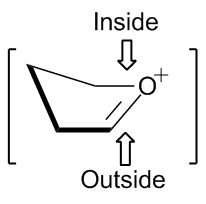
The proposed 5-membered oxocarbenium transition state

The stereochemistry involved in the reactions of five-membered rings can be predicted by an envelope transition state model. Nucleophiles favor addition from the "inside" of the envelope, or from the top of the figure on the right. The "inside" addition produces a results in a staggered conformation, rather than the eclipsed conformation that results from the "outside" addition.

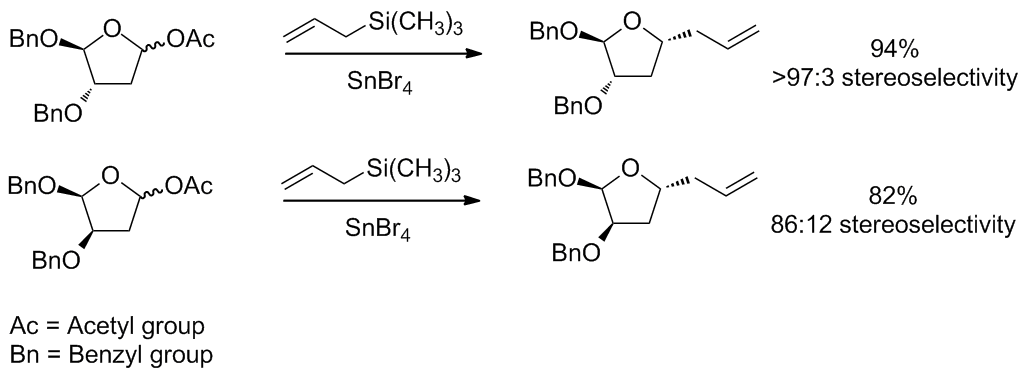

=== 6-membered rings ===
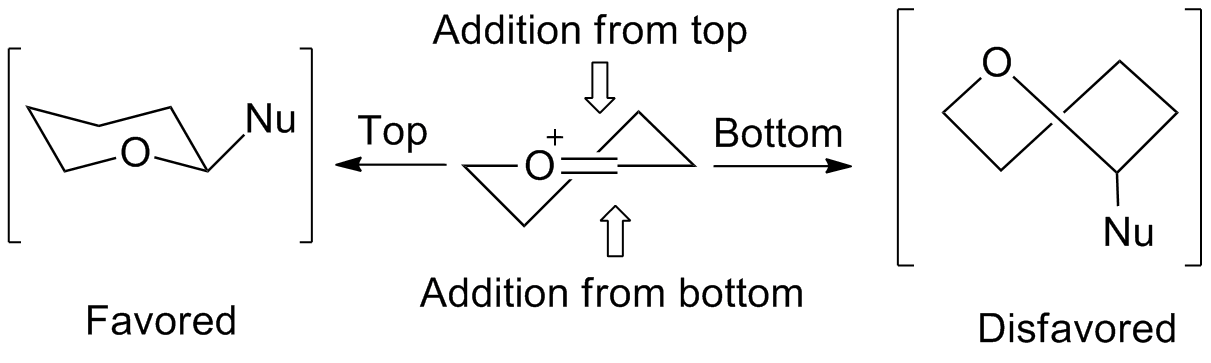
The transition state model for a six-membered oxocarbenium ring

The transition state model for a six-membered oxocarbenium ring was proposed earlier in 1992 by Woods et al. The general strategy for determining the stereochemistry of a nucleophilic addition to a six-membered ring follows a similar procedure to the case of the five-membered ring. The assumption that one makes for this analysis is that the ring is in the same conformation as cyclohexene, with three carbons and the oxygen in a plane with the two other carbon atoms puckered out of the plane, with one above and one below (see the figure to the right). Based on the substituients present on the ring, the lowest energy conformation is determined, keeping in mind steric and stereoelectronic effects (see the section below for a discussion of stereoelectronic effects in oxocarbenium rings). Once this conformation is established, one can consider the nucleophilic addition. The addition will proceed through the low energy chair transition state, rather than the relatively high energy twist-boat. An example of this type of reaction can be seen below. The example also highlights how the stereoelectronic effect exerted by an electronegative substituent flips the lowest energy conformation and leads to opposite selectivity.

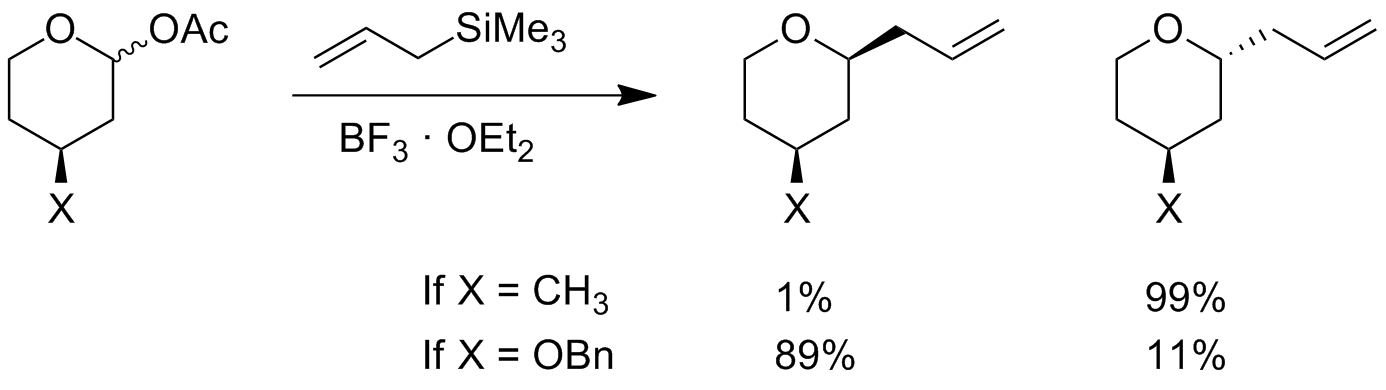

=== Stereoelectronic effects ===
In an alkene ring that does not contain an oxygen atom, any large substituent prefers to be in an equatorial position, in order to minimize steric effects. It has been observed in rings containing oxocarbenium ions that electronegative substituents prefer the axial or pseudo-axial positions. When the electronegative atom is in the axial position, its electron density can be donated through space to the positively charged oxygen atom in the ring. This electronic interaction stabilizes the axial conformation. Hydroxyl groups, ethers and halogens are examples of substituents that exhibit this phenomenon. Stereoelectronic effects must be taken into consideration when determining the lowest energy conformation in the analysis for nucleophilic addition to an oxocarbenium ion.

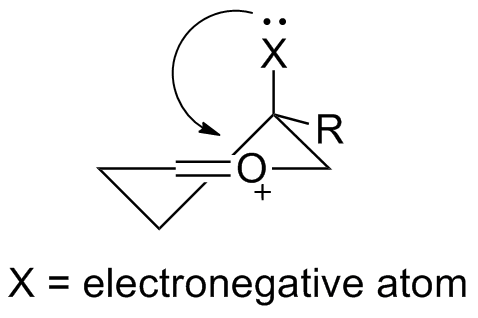

=== Cycloadditions ===
In organic synthesis, vinyl oxocarbenium ions (structure on right) can be utilized in a wide range of cycloaddition reactions. They are commonly employed as dienophiles in the Diels–Alder reaction. An electron withdrawing ketone is often added to the dienophile to increase the rate of the reaction, and these ketones are often converted to vinyl oxocarbenium ions during the reaction. It is not clear that an oxocarbenium ion necessarily will form, but Roush and co-workers demonstrated the oxocarbenium intermediate in the cyclization shown below. Two products were observed in this reaction, which could only form if the oxocarbenium ring is present as an intermediate. [4+3], [2+2], [3+2] and [5+2] cycloadditions with oxocarbenium intermediates have also been reported.

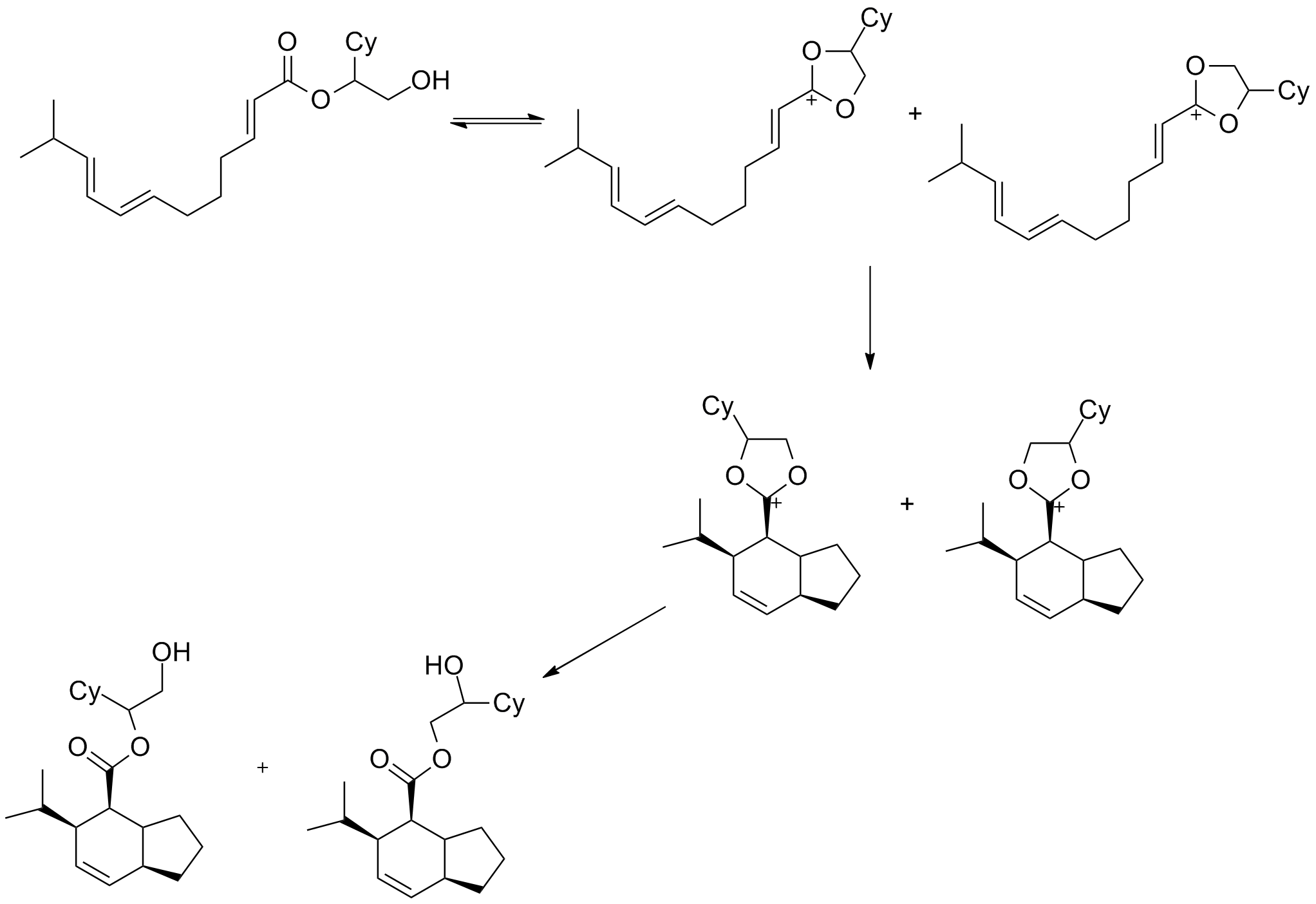

=== Aldol reaction ===
Chiral oxocarbenium ions have been exploited to carry out highly diastereoselective and enantioselective acetate aldol addition reactions. The oxocarbenium ion is used as an electrophile in the reaction. When the methyl group increases in size, the diastereoselevtivity increases.

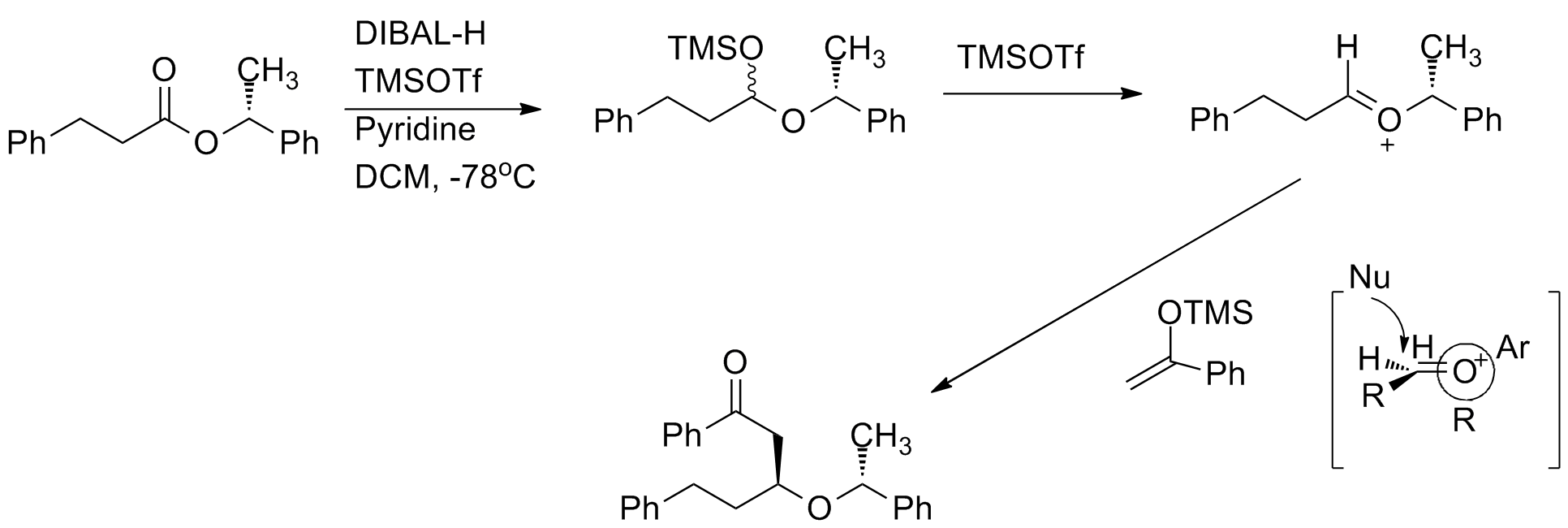

=== Examples from total synthesis ===
Oxocarbenium ions have been utilized in total synthesis on several occasions. A major subunit of (+)-clavosolide was synthesized with a reduction of a six-membered oxocarbenium ring. All the large substituents were found in an equatorial position, and the transformation went through the chair transition state, as predicted.

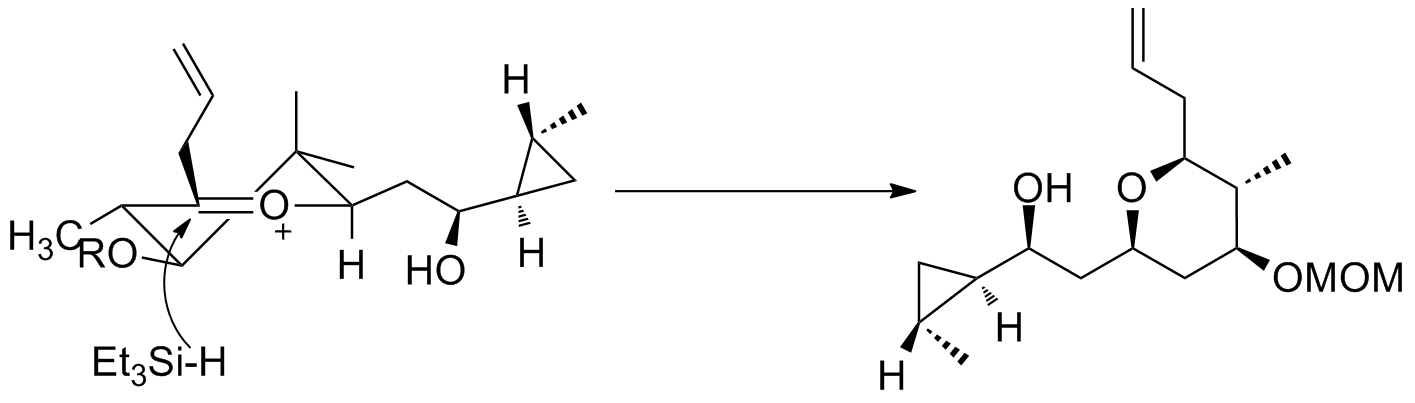

A second example is seen in the key step of the synthesis of (−)-neopeltolide, which uses another six-membered oxocarbenium ring reduction for a diastereoselective hydride addition.

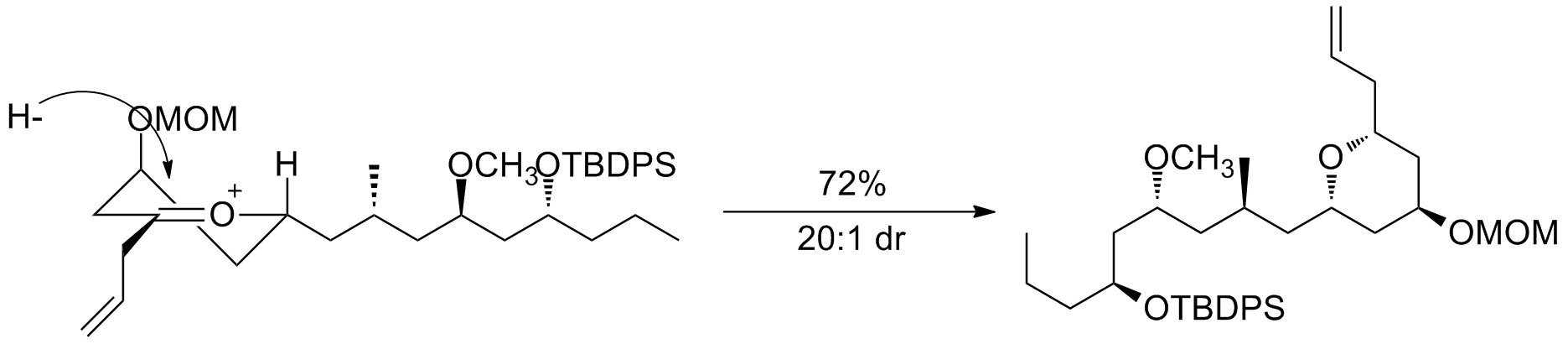

== Applications to biology ==
In biological systems, oxocarbenium ions are mostly seen during reactions of carbohydrates. Since sugars are present in the structure of nucleic acids, with a ribose sugar present in RNA and a deoxyribose present in the structure of DNA, their chemistry plays an important role in wide range of cellular functions of nucleic acids. In addition to their functions in nucleotides, sugars are also used for structural components of organisms, as energy storage molecules, cell signaling molecules, protein modification and play key roles in the immune system, fertilization, preventing pathogenesis, blood clotting, and development. The abundance of sugar chemistry in biological processes leads many reaction mechanisms to proceed through oxocarbenium ions. Several important biological reactions that utilize oxocarbenium ions are outlined in this section.

=== Nucleotide biosynthesis ===
Nucleotides can undergo enzyme-catalyzed intramolecular cyclization in order to produce several important biological molecules. These cyclizations typically proceed through an oxocarbenium intermediate. An example of this reaction can be seen in the cyclization cyclic ADP ribose, which is an important molecule for intracellular calcium signaling.

=== Glycosidases ===
A glycosidase is an enzyme that catalyzes the breakdown of a glycosidic linkage to produce two smaller sugars. This process has important implications in the utilization of stored energy, like glycogen in animals, as well as in the breakdown of cellulose by organisms that feed on plants. In general, aspartic or glutamic acid residues in the active site of the enzyme catalyze the hydrolysis of the glycosidic bond. The mechanism of these enzymes involves an oxocarbenium ion intermediate, a general example of which is shown below.

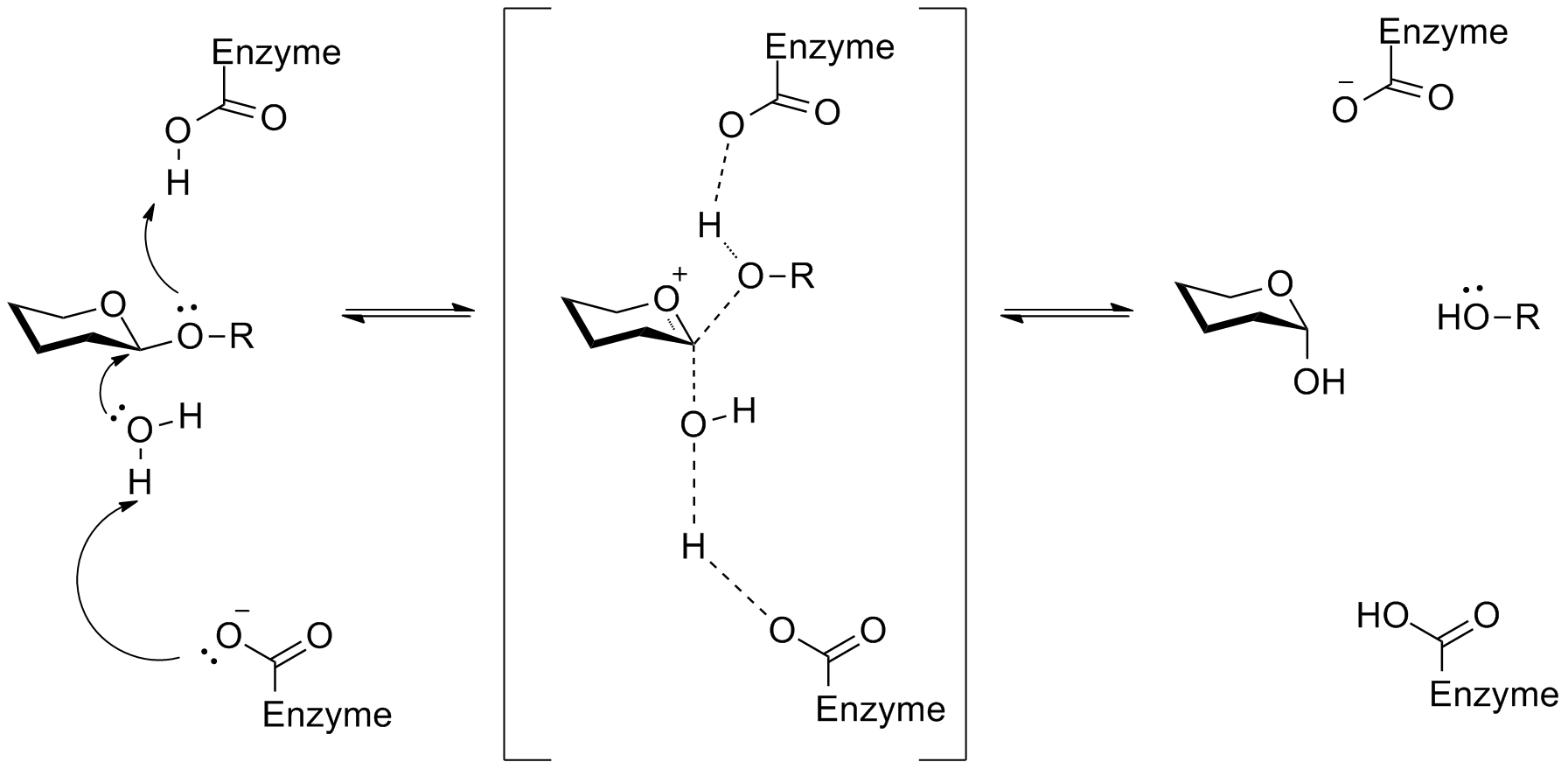

== See also ==
- Carbocation
- Chemical glycosylation
- Glycosyl donor
- Glycosidase
- Oxocarbon anion
