= Glycosyl =

Molecular substituent derived from cyclic monosaccharides

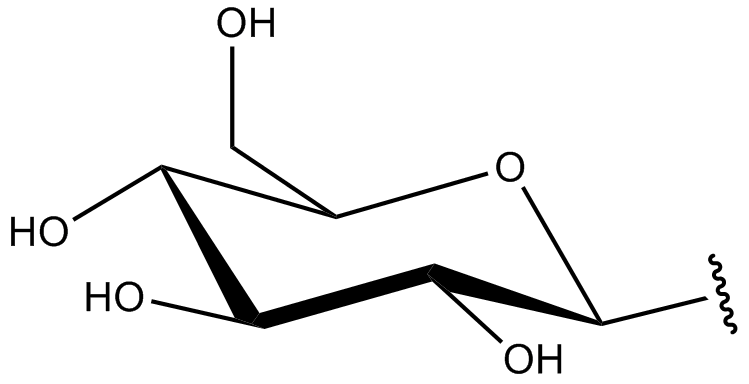
The β-D-glucopyranosyl group which is obtained by the removal of the hemiacetal hydroxyl group (bottom right) from β-D-glucopyranose

In organic chemistry, a glycosyl group is a univalent free radical or substituent structure obtained by removing the hydroxyl (−OH) group from the hemiacetal (−CH(OH)O−) group found in the cyclic form of a monosaccharide and, by extension, of a lower oligosaccharide. Glycosyl groups are exchanged during glycosylation from the glycosyl donor, the electrophile, to the glycosyl acceptor, the nucleophile. The outcome of the glycosylation reaction is largely dependent on the reactivity of each partner. Glycosyl also reacts with inorganic acids, such as phosphoric acid, forming an ester such as glucose 1-phosphate.

== Examples ==
In cellulose, glycosyl groups link together 1,4-β-D-glucosyl units to form chains of (1,4-β-D-glucosyl)_{n}. Other examples include ribityl in 6,7-Dimethyl-8-ribityllumazine, and glycosylamines.

== Alternative substituent groups ==
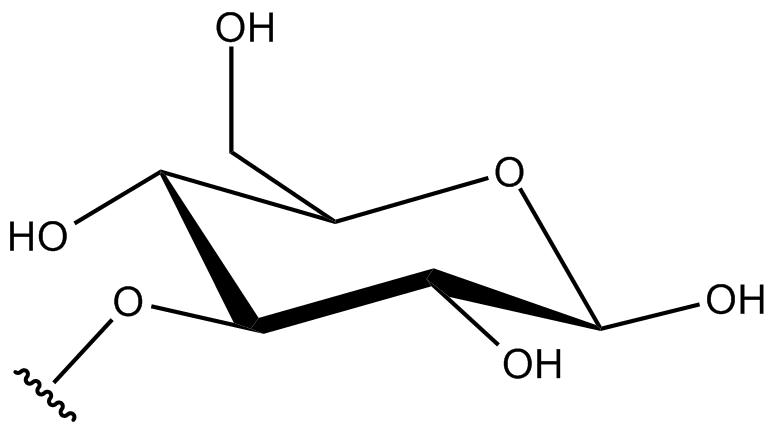
The β-D-glucopyranose-3-O-yl group which is obtained by the removal of a hydrogen from the C3 hydroxyl (bottom left) of β-D-glucopyranose

Instead of the hemiacetal hydroxyl group, a hydrogen atom can be removed to form a substituent, for example the hydrogen from the C3 hydroxyl of a glucose molecule. Then the substituent is called D-glucopyranos-3-O-yl as it appears in the name of the drug Mifamurtide.

Recent detection of Au^{3+} in vivo used C-glycosyl pyrene. Its fluorescence and permeability through cell membranes helped detect Au^{3+}.

== See also ==
- Acyl group
