= Cellobiose phosphorylase =

Class of enzymes

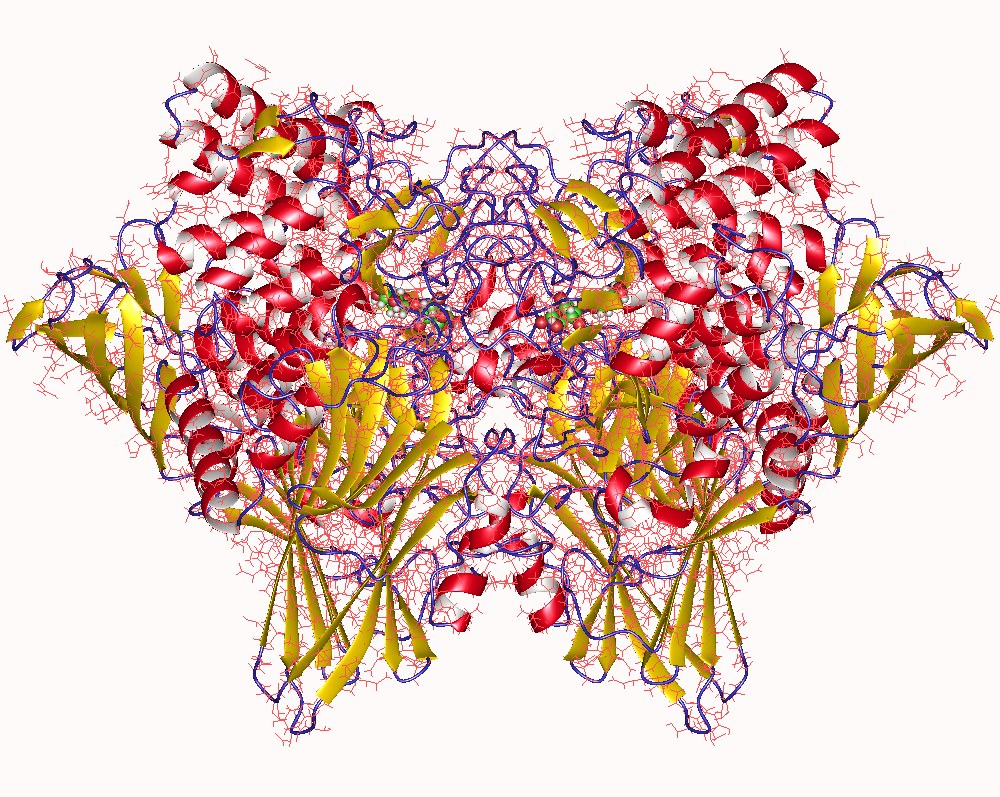
- Cellobiose phosphorylase dimer, Cellulomonas uda

Identifiers
- EC no.: 2.4.1.20
- CAS no.: 9030-20-0

Databases
- IntEnz: IntEnz view
- BRENDA: BRENDA entry
- ExPASy: NiceZyme view
- KEGG: KEGG entry
- MetaCyc: metabolic pathway
- PRIAM: profile
- PDB structures: RCSB PDB PDBe PDBsum
- Gene Ontology: AmiGO / QuickGO
Search
- PMC: articles
- PubMed: articles
- NCBI: proteins

Cellobiose phosphorylase (EC 2.4.1.20) is an enzyme that catalyzes the chemical reaction

cellobiose
P_{i}
α-D-glucose-1-phosphate
+
D-glucose

The two substrates of this enzyme are cellobiose and phosphate (P_{i}). Its products are α-D-glucose-1-phosphate and D-glucose. The enzyme has been characterised from the bacteria Ruminococcus flavefaciens and Clostridium thermocellum.

This enzyme belongs to the family of glycosyltransferases, specifically the hexosyltransferases. The systematic name of this enzyme class is cellobiose:phosphate alpha-D-glucosyltransferase.

== Structural studies ==
As of late 2006, two structures have been solved for this class of enzymes, with PDB accession codes 2CQS and 2CQT.
