= Glycosyl acceptor =

A glycosyl acceptor is any suitable nucleophile-containing molecule that will react with a glycosyl donor to form a new glycosidic bond. By convention, the acceptor is the member of this pair which did not contain the resulting anomeric carbon of the new glycosidic bond. Since the nucleophilic atom of the acceptor is typically an oxygen atom, this can be remembered using the mnemonic of the acceptor is the alcohol. A glycosyl acceptor can be a mono- or oligosaccharide that contains an available nucleophile, such as an unprotected hydroxyl.

== Examples ==
glucose to haemoglobin

== See also ==
- Chemical glycosylation
- Glycosyl halide
- Armed and disarmed saccharides
- Carbohydrate chemistry
