= Glycosyl halide =

Example of a chemical reaction forming a glycosyl iodide, an example of a glycosyl halide

A glycosyl halide is a chemical compound consisting of a glycosyl moiety with a halogen atom bonded to the anomeric carbon atom. They comprise the glycosyl fluorides, glycosyl chlorides, glycosyl bromides, and glycosyl iodides. They are important reagents for chemical glycosylation. An example of a glycosylation reaction involving a glycosyl halide is the Koenigs–Knorr reaction discovered in 1901.
