= Trichloroacetonitrile =

Names
- Preferred IUPAC name Trichloroacetonitrile
- Other names trichlorocyanomethane, trichloroethanenitrile, cyanochloroform, trichloromethyl cyanide, trichloroethyl nitrile

Identifiers
CAS Number	545-06-2
3D model (JSmol)	Interactive image
ChemSpider	13861934
ECHA InfoCard	100.008.078
PubChem CID	11011
UNII	6397DL8869
CompTox Dashboard (EPA)	DTXSID0021672
- InChI: InChI=1S/C2Cl3N/c3-2(4,5)1-6 Key: DRUIESSIVFYOMK-UHFFFAOYSA-N
- SMILES: ClC(Cl)(Cl)C#N

Properties
Chemical formula	C_{2}Cl_{3}N
Molar mass	144.38 g·mol^{−1}
Appearance	colourless liquid
Density	1.44 g/mL
Melting point	−42 °C (−44 °F; 231 K)
Boiling point	83 to 84 °C (181 to 183 °F; 356 to 357 K)
Solubility in water	insoluble

Hazards
- Occupational safety and health (OHS/OSH)
Main hazards	GHS06, GHS09
NFPA 704 (fire diamond)	4 1 0
Flash point	195 °C (383 °F; 468 K)
Safety data sheet (SDS)	MSDS
- Except where otherwise noted, data are given for materials in their standard state (at 25 °C [77 °F], 100 kPa). Infobox references

Trichloroacetonitrile is an organic compound with the formula CCl_{3}CN. It is a colourless liquid, although commercial samples often are brownish. It is used commercially as a precursor to the fungicide etridiazole. It is prepared by dehydration of trichloroacetamide. As a bifunctional compound, trichloroacetonitrile can react at both the trichloromethyl and the nitrile group. The electron-withdrawing effect of the trichloromethyl group activates the nitrile group for nucleophilic additions. The high reactivity makes trichloroacetonitrile a versatile reagent, but also causes its susceptibility towards hydrolysis.

== Synthesis ==
The production of trichloroacetonitrile by dehydration of trichloroacetamide was first described in 1873 by L. Bisschopinck.

Trichloroacetonitrile can be obtained by chlorination of acetonitrile on a zinc, copper and alkaline earth metal halide-impregnated activated carbon catalyst at 200–400 °C with a 54% yield.

The high temperatures required by this process favours the formation of byproducts, such as tetrachloromethane. In contrast, the chlorination of acetonitrile saturated with hydrogen chloride leads to pure trichloroacetonitrile even at 50–80 °C in good yields.

Like other halogenated acetonitriles, trichloroacetonitrile is produced from organic substances such as algae, humic acids and proteinaceous material in the disinfecting chlorination of water from natural sources.

== Properties ==
Rounded bond lengths and angles of trichloroacetonitrile

Freshly-distilled trichloroacetonitrile is a colorless liquid with a pungent odor that discolours rapidly yellowish to light brown. It is sensitive towards water, acids and bases.

The bond lengths are 146.0 pm (C–C), 116.5 pm (C≡N) and 176.3 pm (C–Cl). The bond angle is 110.0° (Cl–C–Cl).

== Use ==
The substitution of all electronegative substituents in trichloroacetonitrile by nucleophilic attack of alkoxide anions produces orthocarbonic acid esters in high yield.

Due to the high reactivity of the chlorine atoms, trichloroacetonitrile can be used (especially in combination with triphenylphosphine) to convert allylic alcohols into the corresponding allylic chlorides.

With carboxylic acids, acyl chlorides are obtained.

Due to the mild reaction conditions, the Cl_{3}CCN/PPh_{3} system is also suitable for the activation of carboxylic acids and their linkage with supported amino compounds to amides (peptides) in solid-phase syntheses. From sulfonic acids, the corresponding sulfochlorides are formed analogously. In an analogous manner, the activation of diphenylphosphoric acid with Cl_{3}CCN/PPh_{3} and reaction with alcohols or amines proceeds to the corresponding phosphoric acid esters or amides in a gentle and efficient one-pot reaction.

Also, phenolic hydroxy groups in nitrogen-containing aromatics can be converted into the chlorine compounds.

In a Hoesch reaction, aromatic hydroxyketones are formed in the reaction of substituted phenols with trichloroacetonitrile, for example from 2-methyl phenol the 2-trichloroacyl derivative in 70% yield.

The electron-withdrawing effect of the trichloromethyl group activates the nitrile group of trichloroacetonitrile for the attack of nucleophilic oxygen, nitrogen and sulfur compounds. For example, alcohols give O-alkyltrichloroacetimidates under basic catalysis in a direct and reversible addition, which can be isolated as stable and less hydrolysis-sensitive adducts.

With primary and secondary amines, N-substituted trichloroacetamidines are formed in a smooth reaction with good yields, which can be purified by vacuum distillation and are obtained as colorless, malodorous liquids. Reaction with ammonia and then with anhydrous hydrogen chloride gives the solid trichloroacetamidine hydrochloride, the starting compound for the fungicide etridiazole.

In academic research, trichloroacetonitrile is used as a reagent in the Overman rearrangement, converting allylic alcohols into allylic amines. The reaction is based on a [3,3]-sigmatropic and diastereoselective rearrangement.

Benzyl trichloroacetimidate is easily accessible from benzyl alcohol and trichloroacetonitrile. Benzyl trichloroacetimidate is useful as a benzylating reagent for sensitive alcohols under mild conditions and to preserve chirality.

=== O-Glycosyl-trichloroacetimidates for the activation of carbohydrates ===
R. R. Schmidt and co-workers have described the selective anomeric activation of O-protected hexopyranoses (glucose, galactose, mannose, glucosamine, galactosamine), hexofuranoses and pentopyranoses with trichloroacetonitrile in the presence of a base, as well as glycosylations under acid catalysis.

Under kinetic control with potassium carbonate as the base, β-trichloroacetimidates are formed selectively, whereas with sodium hydride, caesium carbonate or potassium hydroxide and in the presence of phase-transfer catalysts only α-trichloroacetimidates are obtained (thermodynamically controlled).

The trichloroacetimidates are reacted between −40 °C and room temperature with boron trifluoride etherate in dichloromethane with O-protected sugars. This method usually gives better results than the Koenigs–Knorr method using silver salts or the Helferich method which uses problematic mercury salts. Since an inversion occurs at the anomeric center, the reaction leads to β-O-glycosides (when using α-trichloroacetimidates). The trichloroacetimidate method often produces sterically uniform glycosides under mild reaction conditions in very good yields.

Thioacetic acid reacts with acetyl-protected α-galactosyl trichloroacetimidate even without additional acid catalysis to thioglycoside, from which (after cleavage of the protective groups) 1-thio-β-D-galactose is easily accessible, which is useful for the separation of racemates of amino acids.

Glycosyl trichloroacetimidates can rearrange to glycosyl chlorides in response to UV light.

Trichloroacetonitrile was an important fumigant in the first half of the 20th century, but today it has become obsolete for this application.

== See also ==
- Acetonitrile
- Trichloroacetic acid
- Chloral
