= Glycosyl donor =

A glycosyl donor is a carbohydrate mono- or oligosaccharide that will react with a suitable glycosyl acceptor to form a new glycosidic bond. By convention, the donor is the member of this pair that contains the resulting anomeric carbon of the new glycosidic bond. The resulting reaction is referred to as a glycosylation or chemical glycosylation.

In a glycosyl donor, a leaving group is required at the anomeric position. The simplest leaving group is the OH group that is naturally present in monosaccharides, but it requires activation by acid catalysis in order to function as leaving group (in the Fischer glycosylation). More effective leaving groups are in general used in the glycosyl donors employed in chemical synthesis of glycosides. Typical leaving groups are halides, thioalkyl groups, or imidates, but acetate, phosphate, and O-pentenyl groups are also employed. Natural glycosyl donors contain phosphates as leaving groups.

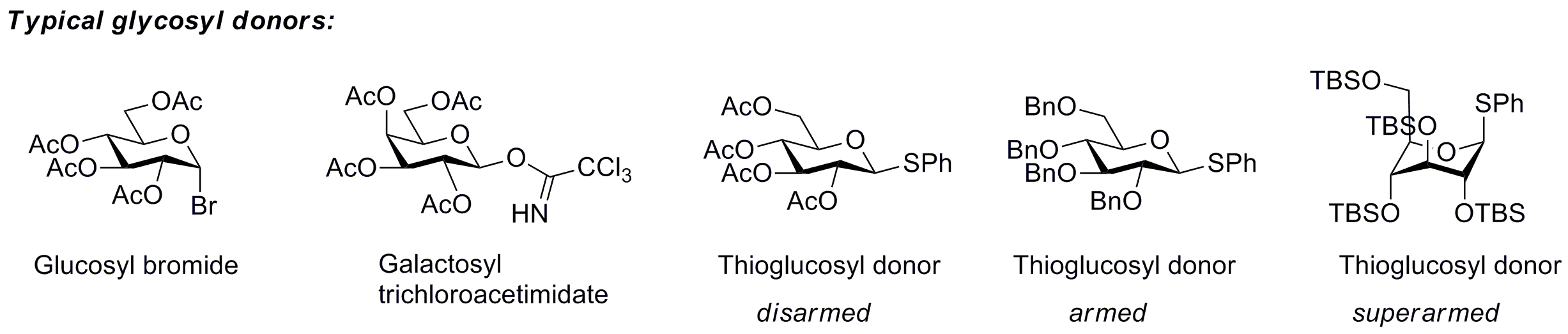
A series of common glycosyl donor types. All are very reactive when activated with a promoter or catalyst: The bromide can be activated by silver salts, the trichloroacetimidate with acid catalysis, and thioglycosides with N-iodosuccinimide/triflic acid. The reactivity of glycosyl donors depend very much on their protection groups, which led to classification of these compounds into three categories of reactivity: Disarmed, armed, and superarmed.

The so-called "armed-disarmed" principle

The concept of armed and disarmed glycosyl donors refers to the increased reactivity of benzylated over benzoylated glycosyl donors, a phenomenon observed very early, and which originates from the greater electron-withdrawing capability of ester blocking groups over ether blocking groups. However, it was Bertram Fraser-Reid who realised that benzylated glycosyl donors can be activated when benzoylated donors are not, and invented the terms armed glycosyl donor for the former, and disarmed glycosyl donor for the latter. He and his group showed that armed glycosyl donors could be coupled to a glycosyl acceptor, that was at the same time a disarmed glycosyl donor, without self-coupling of the disarmed donor/acceptor. This approach allowed him to carry out a one-pot synthesis of a trisaccharide by the n-pentenyl glycoside method.

The concept has been extended to superarmed glycosyl donor by Mikael Bols and his collaborators. He realised that the hydroxy groups of carbohydrates are less electron-withdrawing towards the anomeric center when they are axial than when they are equatorial, which means that glycosyl donor conformers with more axial oxy functions are more reactive. Protection of a glycosyl donor with bulky silyl groups (tert-butyldimethylsilyl or triisopropyl) cause it to change conformation to a more axial-rich conformation that, as a consequence, is more reactive, which Bols and his group called superarmed. They showed that a superarmed donor can be coupled to an armed glycosyl donor/acceptor.

== See also ==
- Glycosyl halide
- Armed and disarmed saccharides
- Carbohydrate chemistry
