= Glucose chain shortening and lengthening =

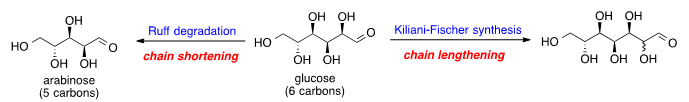
Glucose chain shortening and lengthening is the chemical processes for decreasing or increasing the carbon chain length of glucose. Glucose can be shortened by oxidation and decarboxylation to generate arabinose, a reaction known as the Ruff degradation. To increase the glucose carbon chain, a series of chemical reactions can be used to add one more carbon at the aldehyde end of glucose; this process is known as the Kiliani–Fischer synthesis.

== Glucose chain shortening ==
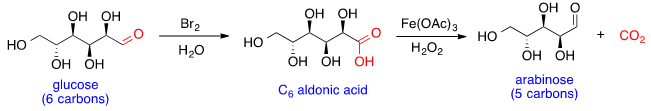
Glucose can react with bromine in water to form the aldonic acid, which can then undergo oxidative decarboxylation with hydrogen peroxide and iron (III) acetate to form arabinose. This reaction can be conducted iteratively, shortening one carbon at a time to generate sugars with smaller chain lengths.

== Glucose chain lengthening ==
Glucose can be the substrate in Kiliani–Fischer synthesis that adds a carbon to the aldehyde group and forms sugars with one more carbon than the substrate. The first step is nucleophilic addition of aqueous cyanide to aldehyde group in glucose to generate the cyanohydrin. Then cyanohydrin is hydrolyzed to form aldonic acid lactone upon heating. Finally, the aldonic acid lactone is reduced with sodium amalgam non-stereoselectively to produce heptose; two isomers with both stereoisomers at C2 are generated.
