= Biphalin =

Chemical compound

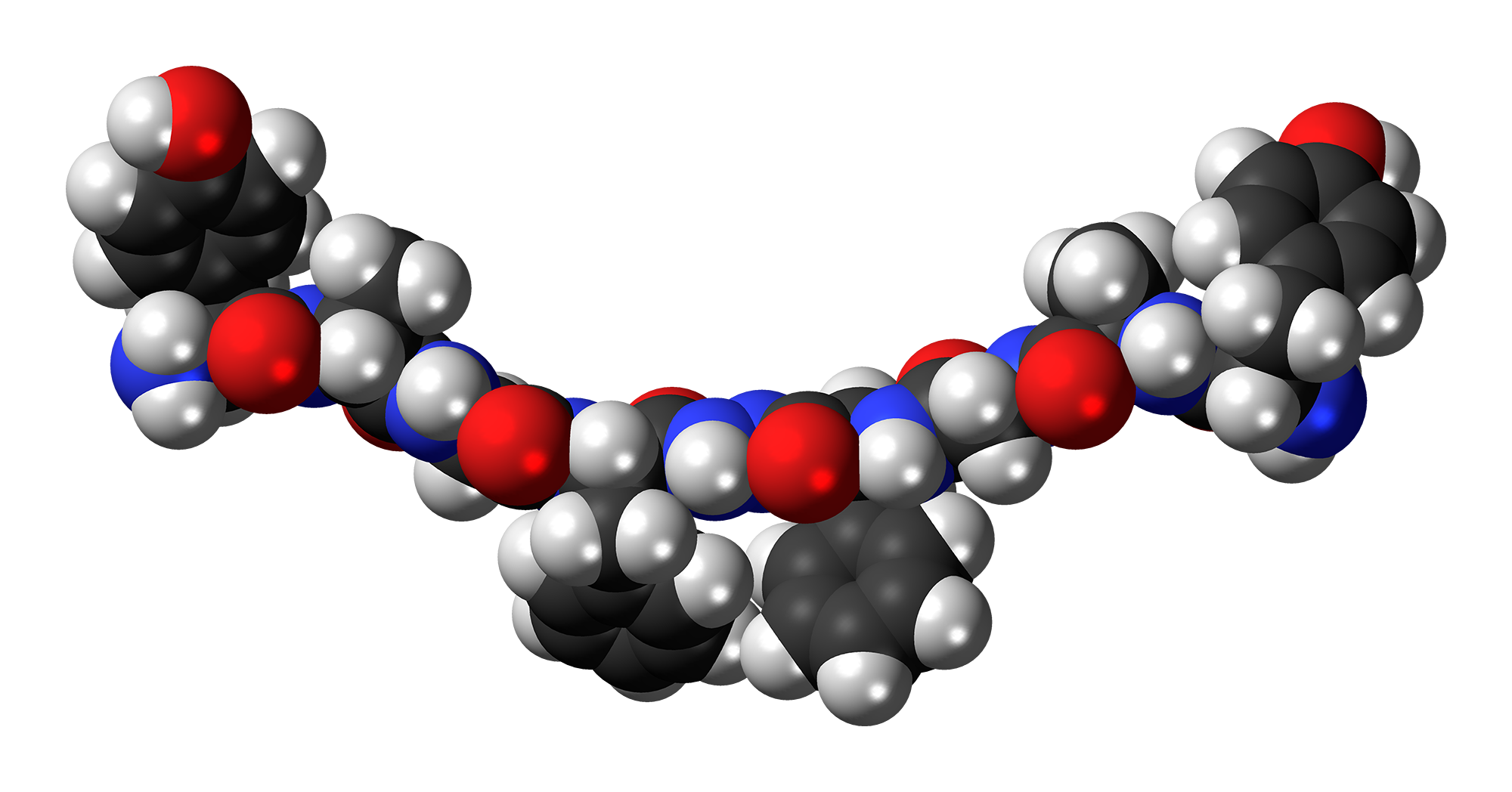

Clinical data
- ATC code: None

Identifiers
- IUPAC name: (2S,2’S)-N,N’-[(2R,8S,13S,19R)-8,13-Dibenzyl-3,6,9,12,15,18-hexaoxo-4,7,10,11,14,17-hexaazaicosane-2,19-diyl]bis[2-amino-3-(4-hydroxyphenyl)propanamide]
- CAS Number: 83916-01-2 UNII2_Ref =
- PubChem CID: 5487663
- ChemSpider: 4589475
- UNII: 4QHN3LYD63
- CompTox Dashboard (EPA): DTXSID80232802

Chemical and physical data
- Formula: C_{46}H_{56}N_{10}O_{10}
- Molar mass: 909.014 g·mol^{−1}
- 3D model (JSmol): Interactive image
- SMILES: O=C(N[C@@H](C(=O)NCC(=O)N[C@H](C(=O)NNC(=O)[C@@H](NC(=O)CNC(=O)[C@H](NC(=O)[C@@H](N)Cc1ccc(O)cc1)C)Cc2ccccc2)Cc3ccccc3)C)[C@@H](N)Cc4ccc(O)cc4
- InChI: InChI=1S/C46H56N10O10/c1-27(51-43(63)35(47)21-31-13-17-33(57)18-14-31)41(61)49-25-39(59)53-37(23-29-9-5-3-6-10-29)45(65)55-56-46(66)38(24-30-11-7-4-8-12-30)54-40(60)26-50-42(62)28(2)52-44(64)36(48)22-32-15-19-34(58)20-16-32/h3-20,27-28,35-38,57-58H,21-26,47-48H2,1-2H3,(H,49,61)(H,50,62)(H,51,63)(H,52,64)(H,53,59)(H,54,60)(H,55,65)(H,56,66)/t27-,28-,35+,36+,37+,38+/m1/s1; Key:DESSEGDLRYOPTJ-VRANXALZSA-N

Biphalin is a dimeric enkephalin endogenous peptide (Tyr-D-Ala-Gly-Phe-NH)_{2} composed of two tetrapeptides derived from enkephalins, connected 'tail-to-tail' by a hydrazide bridge. The presence of two distinct pharmacophores confers on biphalin a high affinity for both μ and δ opioid receptors (with an EC_{50} of about 1–5 nM for both μ and δ receptors), therefore it has analgesic activity. Biphalin presents a considerable antinociceptive profile. In fact, when administered intracerebroventricularly in mice, biphalin displays a potency almost 7-fold greater than that of the ultra-potent alkaloid agonist, etorphine and 7000-fold greater than morphine; biphalin and morphine were found to be equipotent after intraperitoneal administration. The extraordinary in vivo potency shown by this compound is coupled with low side-effects, in particular, to produce no dependency in chronic use. For these reasons, several efforts have been carried out in order to obtain more information about structure-activity relationship (SAR). Results clearly indicate that, at least for μ receptor binding, the presence of two pharmacophores is not necessary; Tyr^{1} is indispensable for analgesic activity, while replacing Phe at the position 4 and 4' with non-aromatic, but lipophilic amino acids does not greatly change the binding properties and in general 4,4' positions are found to be important to design biphalin analogues with increased potency and modified μ/δ selectivity. The hydrazide linker is not fundamental for activity or binding, and it can be conveniently substituted by different conformationally constrained cycloaliphatic diamine linkers.
