= Hydrazide =

Class of chemical compounds

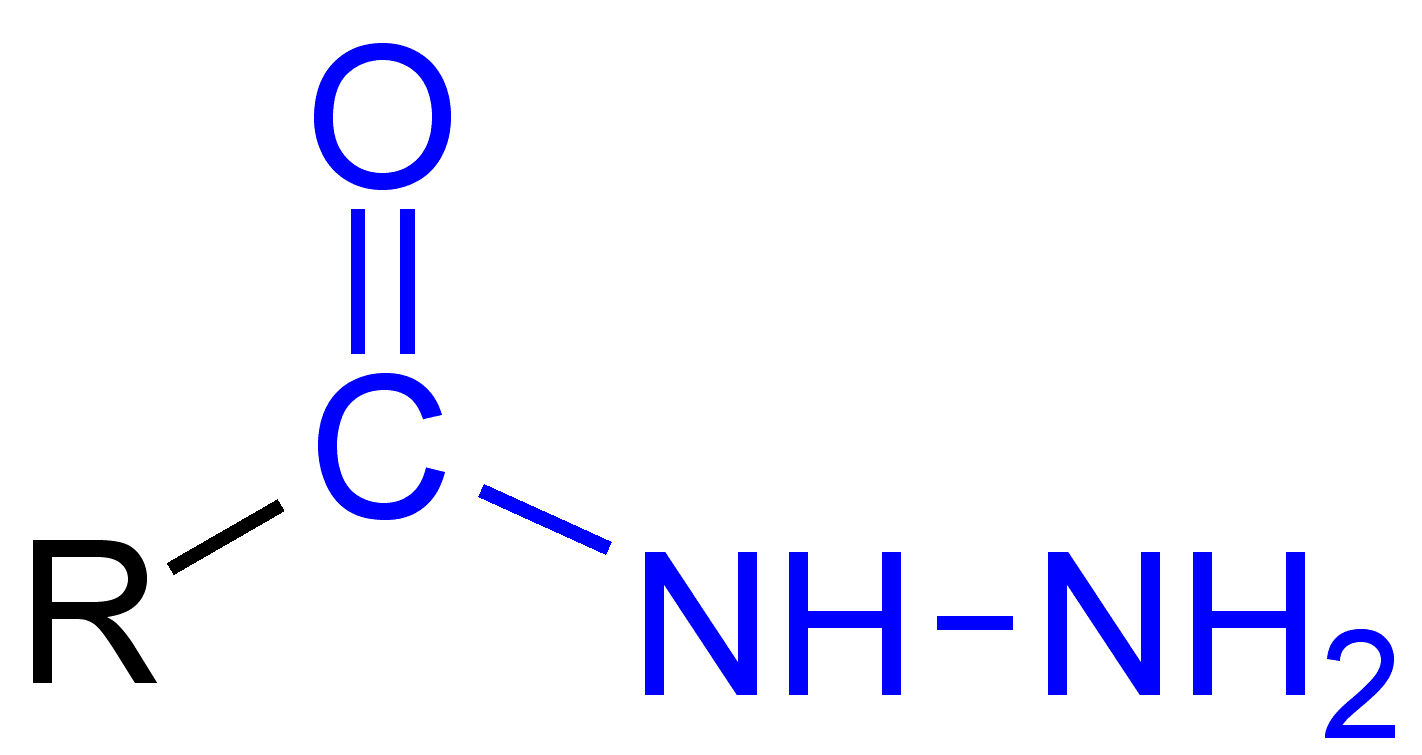

Hydrazides in organic chemistry are a class of organic compounds with the formula R−NR^{1}−NR^{2}R^{3} where R is acyl (R'−C(=O)−), sulfonyl (R'−S(=O)_{2}−), phosphoryl ((R'−)_{2}P(=O)−), phosphonyl ((R'−O−)_{2}P(=O)−), etc. and R^{1}, R^{2}, R^{3} and R' are any groups (typically hydrogen or organyl). Unlike hydrazine and alkylhydrazines, hydrazides are nonbasic owing to the inductive influence of the acyl, sulfonyl, or phosphoryl substituent.

== Sulfonyl hydrazides ==
A common sulfonyl hydrazide is p-toluenesulfonyl hydrazide, a white air-stable solid. They are also widely used as organic reagents.

Toluenesulfonyl hydrazide is used to generate toluenesulfonyl hydrazones. Derived from ketones, these hydrazones participate in the Shapiro reaction and the Eschenmoser–Tanabe fragmentation.

2,4,6-Triisopropylbenzenesulfonylhydrazide is a useful source of diimide.

== Acyl hydrazides ==
An example of an acylhydrazine. This compound has been called acetylhydrazide, acetohydrazide, or acetic acid hydrazide.

Acylhydrazines are derivatives of carboxylic acids, although they are typically prepared by the reaction of esters with hydrazine.

Transamidation is possible but requires long-duration heat, and acyl moieties rarely migrate off another hydrazide. An exception are the chloral hydrazones, which deacylate easily.

Alternatively, bromine oxidizes aldehydic hydrazones to a hydrazoyl bromide, which then hydrolyzes to an acyl hydrazide.

Lithium aluminum hydride reduces acylhydrazides to the hydrazine only if the hydrazide lacks a labile proton.

They are also the product of the Schestakov rearrangement.

=== Use ===
An applied example is a synthesis of sunitinib begins by mixing 5-fluoroisatin slowly into hydrazine hydrate. After 4 hours at 110 °C, the indole ring structure has been broken into (2-amino-5-fluoro-phenyl)-acetic acid hydrazide with reduction of the ketone at the 3-position. Subsequent annelation in strong acid creates the 1,3-dihydro-2-oxo indole structure required for the drug.

== See also ==
- Hydrazide imide – tautomeric form of amidrazone
