= Ruff degradation =

Reaction in organic chemistry

Ruff degradation is a reaction used to shorten the open chain forms of monosaccharides. It is functionally the reverse reaction of Kiliani-Fischer synthesis.

In 1898, Otto Ruff published his work on the transformation of D-Glucose to D-Arabinose later called the Ruff degradation. In this reaction, D-Glucose is converted to D-Arabinose. In this reaction, the terminal aldehyde group is converted to a carboxylic acid group, using selective oxidation of the aldehyde using Bromine water and then converted to gluconate ion. Next, Fe(OAc)_{3} with 30% of H_{2}O_{2} is added.

Thus COO- ion will form CO_{2} and a stereo selective compound will form. And below -CH_{2}OH will convert to -CHO group through the reduction of iron from its +3 state to +2 state, thus forming D-Arabinose.

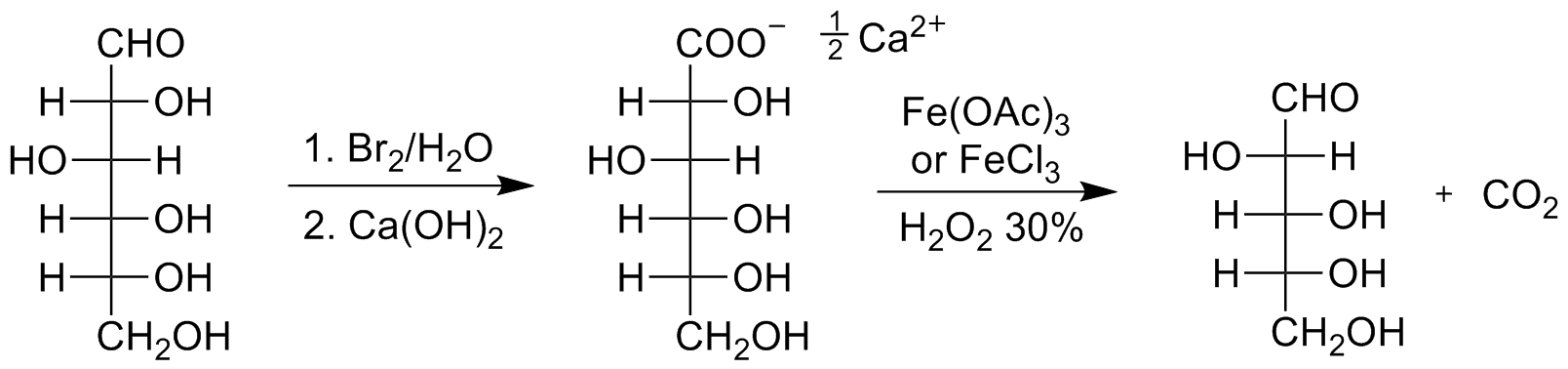
Hexoses converted to pentoses by Ruff degradation

This reaction was an important tool used by Emil Fischer to show that D-Glucose and D-Mannose each formed the same product upon Ruff degradation (D-Arabinose) indicating them to have opposite configurations at C-2 (epimers). Further Ruff degradation on D-Arabinose gave D-Glyceraldehyde, which established the stereochemistry of the chiral center on C-5.

== See also ==
- Kiliani-Fischer synthesis
