= Otto Ruff =

German chemist (1871–1939)

- Born: 30 December 1871; Schwäbisch Hall, German Empire
- Died: 17 September 1939 (aged 67); Breslau
- Education: University of Berlin
- Known for: fluorine chemistry, high temperature and high-pressure chemistry
- Awards: Liebig Medal
- Scientific career
- Fields: Chemist
- Thesis: Über die Reduktion des tertiären Nitroisobutylglycerins und das Oxim des Dioxyacetons (1897)
- Doctoral advisor: Oskar Piloty

Otto Ruff (30 December 1871 – 17 September 1939) was a German chemist.

== Life ==
Otto Ruff was born in Schwäbisch Hall, Württemberg. After becoming a pharmacist under the supervision of Carl Magnus von Hell (known from the Hell-Volhard-Zelinsky halogenation) at the University of Stuttgart he joined the group of Hermann Emil Fischer at the University of Berlin. Fischer was noted for his work on carbohydrates (sugars) and so Ruff started his career as an organic chemist. In 1898 he published his work on the transformation of d-Glucose to d-Arabinose, later called the Ruff degradation.

Supported by the far-sighted Fischer, who recognized that while organic chemistry was now mature, physical chemistry was growing rapidly, Ruff became head of the new inorganic department in Berlin, working alongside Alfred Stock who was five years his junior. This drastic change in subject benefited Ruff during his work on chlorides sulfur compounds.

In 1902 he married Meta Richter, a pharmacist, and from this marriage he had three children. In 1904 he became a professor at the Technical University of Danzig and from 1916 onward he was head of the inorganic chemistry department at the Technical University of Breslau.

He died three years after his retirement in 1939. His last years of teaching were made miserable by a privatdozent and assistant, Helmut Hartmann, who had joined the Nazi party and became an "insolent politician" who made life unbearable for many.

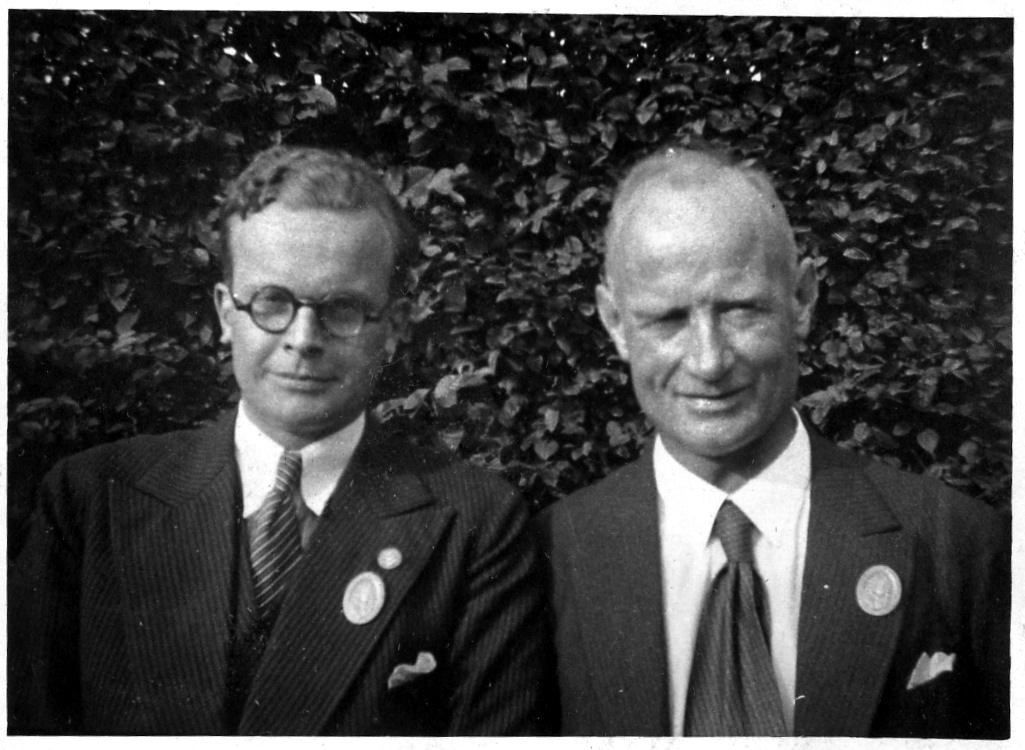
Prof. Ruff (r.) with assistant Manfred Giese (l.) between 1932 and 1934

== Scientific achievements ==
Otto Ruff published 290 papers and two books. The books were: "The Chemistry of Fluorine" (published in 1920 by Springer Verlag, Berlin) and "Introduction to Chemical Practicum" (Leipzig 1926, 2nd edition 1937). His papers can be categorized as follows: chemistry of sugars (17 papers), inorganic chemistry of fluorine (86), high temperature chemistry (44), electrolysis of molten salts (9), plastics (10), carbides (20), explosions in mines (7), other fields of inorganic chemistry (72).

Along with Svante Arrhenius, Henri Moissan, and Alfred Werner, all of whom received Nobel Prizes, O. Ruff was regarded as the driver of the achievements of inorganic chemistry in first decades of the 20th century.

== See also ==
- Ruff degradation

== Literature ==
- W.Hückel (1940). "Obituary: Otto Ruff 30. 12. 1871 - 17. 9. 1939". Berichte der Deutschen Chemischen Gesellschaft. 73 (12): A125–A156. doi:10.1002/cber.19400731202.
- Teresa Sokolowska, Romuald Piosik (2004). "Otto Ruff und Alfred Wohl. Professoren der 1904 gegründeten Königlichen Technischen Hochschule zu Danzig". Chemkon. 11 (2): 76–78. doi:10.1002/ckon.200410006.
