= Hermann Otto Laurenz Fischer =

Hermann Otto Laurenz Fischer (16 December 1888 – 9 March 1960) was a German American professor of biochemistry and son of Emil Fischer. Fischer's work was on synthesis and the determination of structures of organic compounds.

Fischer was born the eldest son in Würzburg to Emil Fischer, professor of chemistry, and Agnes Gerlach. The family moved to Berlin in 1892 where Fischer went to the Gymnasium. While the other two brothers sought medical careers, he chose chemistry, studying in Cambridge in 1907 after being impressed by Sir William Ramsay who had made a family visit. He then engaged in military service. Afterwards, Fischer went to the University of Berlin and later Jena where he studied tautomerism of diketones under Ludwig Knorr. He then went to Berlin to study under his father and was involved in the synthesis of didepsides. World War I led to all the brothers being drafted, with Hermann joining a chemical warfare unit. His two brothers died during the war and in 1919 his father died. Hermann continued to work in reorganizing the Berlin institute and collaborated with Gerda Dangschat and Erich Baer on elucidating structures and in the synthesis of various compounds including the quinic ester of caffeic acid and the D-enantiomorph of DL-glyceraldehyde-3-phosphate which was used in studies of alcoholic fermentation and glycolysis. Fischer married Ruth Seckels in 1922 and they had three children. In 1932 he moved to the University of Basel and in 1937, he went to the University of Toronto to work with Sir Frederick Banting. In 1948 Fischer joined the University of California, Berkeley where he spent the last years of his life as a professor.
