= Agaritine =

- Stereo structural formula of agaritine ((2S)-2-amino)

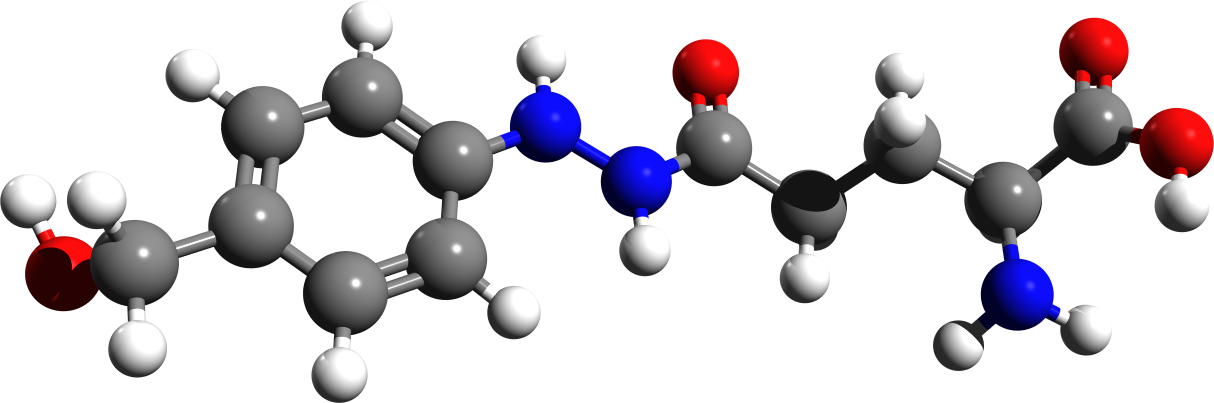
- Ball and stick model of agaritine ((2S)-2-amino)

Names
- IUPAC name 2-[4-(Hydroxymethyl)phenyl]-glutamohydrazide
- Systematic IUPAC name 2-Amino-4-{N'-[4-(hydroxymethyl)phenyl]hydrazinecarbonyl}butanoic acid
- Other names β-N-[γ-glutamyl]-4-hydroxymethylphenylhydrazine; N2-(γ-glutamyl)-4-hydroxymethylphenylhydrazine

Identifiers
CAS Number	2757-90-6
3D model (JSmol)	Interactive image
Abbreviations	AGT
Beilstein Reference	757731
ChEBI	CHEBI:15336
ChemSpider	388610
KEGG	C01550
MeSH	Agaritine
PubChem CID	17688; 439517 (2S)-2-amino; 439516
RTECS number	MA1284000
UNII	UX8Y7QVP8M
CompTox Dashboard (EPA)	DTXSID9020661
- InChI: InChI=1S/C12H17N3O4/c13-10(12(18)19)5-6-11(17)15-14-9-3-1-8(7-16)2-4-9/h1-4,10,14,16H,5-7,13H2,(H,15,17)(H,18,19)/t10-/m0/s1 Key: SRSPQXBFDCGXIZ-JTQLQIEISA-N; InChI=1/C12H17N3O4/c13-10(12(18)19)5-6-11(17)15-14-9-3-1-8(7-16)2-4-9/h1-4,10,14,16H,5-7,13H2,(H,15,17)(H,18,19)/t10-/m0/s1 Key: SRSPQXBFDCGXIZ-JTQLQIEIBZ
- SMILES: [O-]C(=O)[C@@H]([NH3+])CCC(=O)NNc1ccc(cc1)CO

Properties
Chemical formula	C_{12}H_{17}N_{3}O_{4}
Molar mass	267.285 g·mol^{−1}
Melting point	203 °C (397 °F; 476 K)
Acidity (pK_{a})	3.4

Hazards
- Occupational safety and health (OHS/OSH)
Main hazards	Toxic
- Except where otherwise noted, data are given for materials in their standard state (at 25 °C [77 °F], 100 kPa). verify (what is ?) Infobox references

Agaritine is an aromatic hydrazine-derivative mycotoxin in mushroom species of the genus Agaricus. It is an α-aminoacid and a derivative of phenylhydrazine.

== Occurrence ==
Agaritine is present as a natural mycotoxin in fresh samples of at least 24 species of the genera Agaricus, Leucoagaricus, and Macrolepiota. Mushrooms of these species are found around the world. These mushrooms grow in a wide range of habitats. Agaricus bisporus is cultivated in over 70 countries and on every continent except Antarctica. A. bisporus, also known as the portobello or common button mushroom, is of particular socio-economic importance in developed countries.

Agaritine content varies between individual mushrooms and across species. Agaritine content (% fresh weight) in raw Agaricus bisporus, for example, ranges from 0.033% to 0.173%, with an average of 0.088%. The highest amount of agaritine is found in the cap and gills of the fruiting body, and the lowest in the stem. Agaratine decomposes significantly between harvest and sale, and it has also been shown to decompose readily upon cooking (up to 90% reduction) as well as upon freezing (up to 75% reduction).

== Production ==
Agaritine occurs naturally in mushrooms and can be extracted from cultivated Agaricus bisporus mushrooms with water or methanol.

Total industrial syntheses of agaritine have been completed, with an 83% yield, and the overall yield of 33%.

== Potential for toxicity ==
Although recognized as an experimental carcinogen when used in high laboratory doses, there is inadequate evidence to classify Agaritine as carcinogenic to humans in amounts ingested from consuming mushrooms.

== See also ==
- Agaritine gamma-glutamyltransferase
- Gyromitrin
