= Hydrazone iodination =

Chemical reaction

Hydrazone iodination is an organic reaction in which a hydrazone is converted into a vinyl iodide by reaction of iodine and a non-nucleophilic base such as DBU. First published by Derek Barton in 1962 the reaction is sometimes referred to as the Barton reaction (although there are many different Barton reactions) or, more descriptively, as the Barton vinyl iodine procedure.

The reaction has earlier roots with the 1911 discovery by Wieland and Roseau that the reaction of hydrazones with iodine alone (without base) results in the azine dimer (structure 2 in scheme 1).

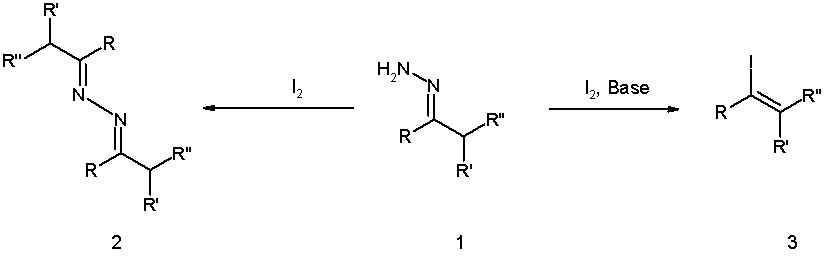
Iodination of hydrazones

In the original Barton publication the reaction was optimized by using a strong guanidine base, the inverse addition of the hydrazone to an iodine solution, and by exclusion of water.

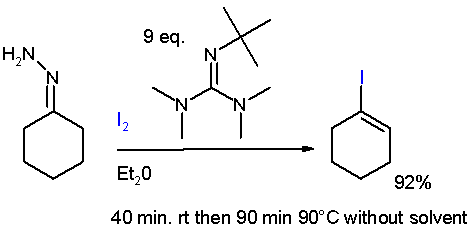
Barton vinyl iodide synthesis

When iodine as an electrophile is replaced by aromatic selenyl bromides, the corresponding vinyl selenides are obtained:

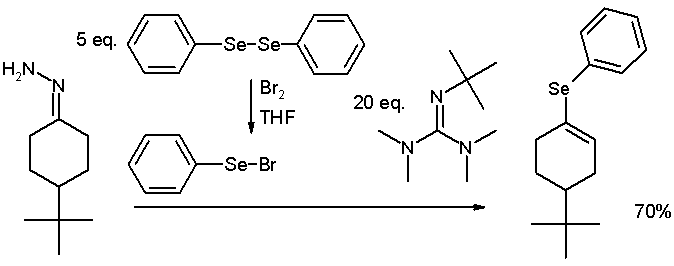
Vinyl selenide synthesis

== Reaction mechanism ==
The reaction mechanism proposed in the original Barton publication is outlined as follows:

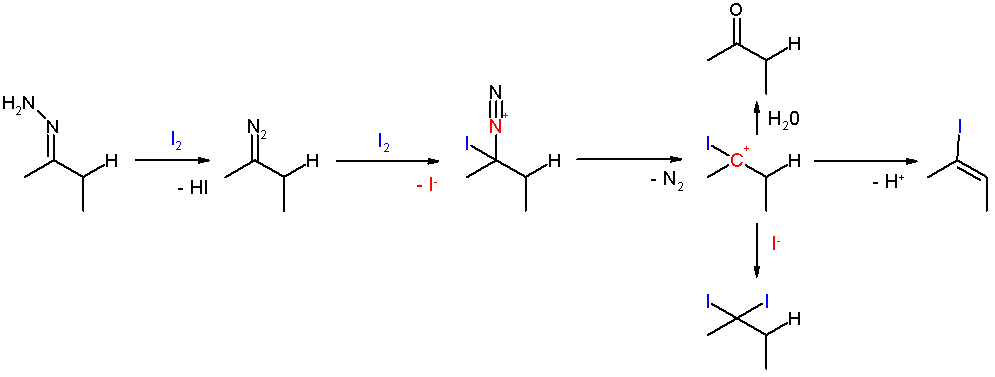
Hydrazone iodization reaction mechanism

The hydrazone is oxidized by iodine into a diazo intermediate. In the next step, iodine reacts as an electrophile; displacement of nitrogen then generates an iodocarbonium ion. When the reaction site is not sterically hindered, a second iodide can recombine to form the geminal di-iodide; otherwise an elimination reaction leads to the vinyliodide. When water is present, the reaction product can revert to the ketone.

This reaction is related to the Shapiro reaction.

== Scope ==
An example of this procedure is the reaction of 2,2,6-trimethylcyclohexanone to the hydrazone by reaction with hydrazine and triethylamine in ethanol at reflux followed by reaction of the hydrazone with iodine in the presence of 2-tert-butyl-1,1,3,3-tetramethylguanidine (cheaper than DBU) in diethyl ether at room temperature. Another example can be found in the Danishefsky Taxol total synthesis.

In one study it is attempted to trap any reactive intermediate of this reaction with an internal alkene. When the hydrazone 1 in scheme 5 is reacted with iodine and triethylamine in toluene, the expected reaction product is not the di-iodide 10 through path B in a free radical mechanism. Reaction sequence starting from 1: halogen addition reaction to di-iodide intermediate 2 followed by elimination reaction with loss of Hydrogen iodide to 3. In path B another equivalent of iodine reacts to the azo double bond followed by loss of HI and formation of 6. The nitrogen to iodine bond is weak and homolysis gives the nitrogen free radical 7. Loss of nitrogen results in radical species 8. The radical position gets transferred to the alkene in 9 which later recombines with iodide to 10. Note that in absence of the alkene 8 would accept an iodide radical and the geminal di-iodide then loses HI to form the vinyl iodide. The actual process taking place is path A with elimination of HI to the diazo compound 4 followed by a diazoalkane 1,3-dipolar cycloaddition to the pyrazoline 5 in 85% yield.

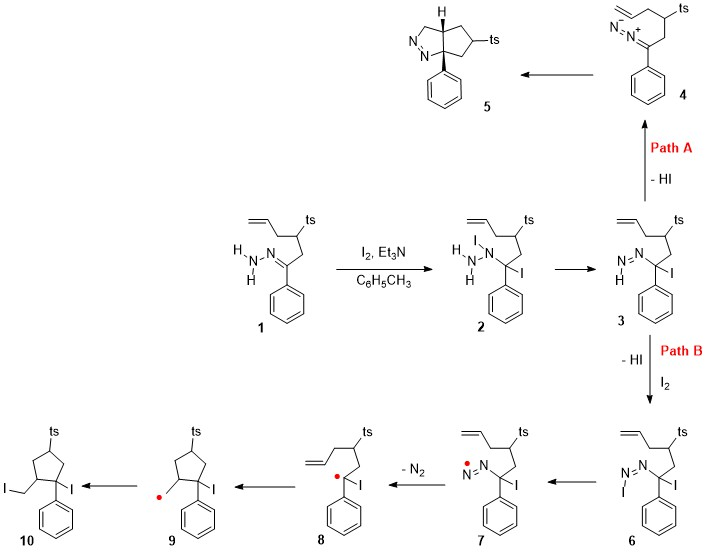
Hydrazone iodination mechanism internal trapping

== See also ==
- Shapiro reaction
