= List of fellows of the Royal Society elected in 1899 =

Fellows of the Royal Society elected in 1899.

== Fellows ==
1. William Fletcher Barrett (1844–1925)
2. Charles Booth (1840–1916)
3. David Bruce (1855–1931)
4. Henry John Horstman Fenton (1854–1929)
5. James Sykes Gamble (1847–1925)
6. Alfred Cort Haddon (1855–1940)
7. Henry Head (1861–1940)
8. Henry Selby Hele-Shaw (1854–1941)
9. Conwy Lloyd Morgan (1852–1936)
10. Clement Reid (1853–1916)
11. Robert Romer (1840–1918)
12. George John Shaw-Lefevre (1831–1928)
13. Ernest Henry Starling (1866–1927)
14. Henry William Lloyd Tanner (1851–1915)
15. Richard Threlfall (1861–1932)
16. Alfred Edwin Howard Tutton (1864–1938)
17. Bertram Coghill Alan Windle (1858–1929)

== Foreign members ==
1. Ludwig Boltzmann (1844–1906)
2. Felix Anton Dohrn (1840–1909)
3. Emil Hermann Fischer (1852–1919)
4. Georg Balthasar von Neumayer (1826–1909)
5. Melchior Treub (1851–1910)
