= Henry John Horstman Fenton =

British chemist (1854-1929)

Henry John Horstman Fenton (18 February 1854 – 13 January 1929) was a British chemist who, in the 1890s, invented Fenton's reagent, a solution of hydrogen peroxide and an iron catalyst that is used to oxidize contaminants or waste waters. Fenton's reagent can be used to destroy organic compounds such as trichloroethylene (TCE) and tetrachloroethylene (PCE).

Henry Fenton was born in Ealing, the youngest of 8 children of John Fenton, a merchant, and Ellen. He was educated at Magdalen College School, King's College London and Christ's College, Cambridge. He became the university demonstrator in chemistry at Cambridge in 1878, and was University Lecturer in Chemistry from 1904 to 1924.

Fenton was elected a Fellow of the Royal Society in 1899.

== Studies ==
His earliest published work examined oxidations of simple compounds. Somewhat later, but still early in his career, he reported the peculiar blue color that formed when tartaric acid was treated with hydrogen peroxide in the presence of ferrous salts. The same effect is not seen with ferric ion, but the amount of iron was unimportant, implying that the ferrous salt is a catalyst. This reaction is the basis of thousands of publications and much technology.

== Private life ==
Fenton married Edith Isabella Ferguson, 17 years his younger, on 6 December 1892 at St Matthias Church, Richmond. They had no children. He died on 13 January 1929 and was buried at Putney Vale Cemetery four days later.

== Works ==
- Outlines of Chemistry
- Notes on Qualitative Analysis

== See also ==
- Environmental remediation

== Notes ==
List of fellows of the Royal Society elected in 1899
