= Hydrazone =

Class of organic compounds

General structure of Hydrazone

Hydrazones are a class of organic compounds that contain the C=N−N motif in their structure. They are closely related to imines, with the difference being that they are usually formed by the action of hydrazine or hydrazides on ketones or aldehydes instead of amines.

== Synthesis ==
Hydrazine, its hydrate, and various organohydrazines react with aldehydes and ketones to give hydrazones, as shown in the following general scheme, with a suitable solvent:

Phenylhydrazine reacts with reducing sugars to form hydrazones known as osazones, which were developed by the German chemist Emil Fischer as a test to differentiate between monosaccharides. Hydrazones having a 1,3-diketomoiety are also known in the literature.

More generally, diazonium ions react with carbon acids in the Japp-Klingemann reaction to give hydrazones via tautomeric rearrangement of a diazo intermediate.

== Uses ==
In the recent years hydrazones have been extensively used in the development of a variety of different biologically active molecules as well as drug delivery agents. They have also gained significant interest in the field of supramolecular chemistry.

=== Molecular Biology ===
Hydrazones and their potential biological activities.

Hydrazones, especially the ones having an azomethine -NHN=CH proton, have been reported to exhibit antimicrobial, antitubercular, antitumoral, anti-inflammatory, analgesic, and other biological activities and hence they have been extensively used as components in the development of drugs. In fact, isoniazid (INH) is a well-known drug used to treat tuberculosis, and there exists more than 3000 compounds containing INH in the chemical databases out of which about 2000 are hydrazones formed upon linking of isoniazid to some aldehyde/ketone. 6 out of them are listed in the 13^{th} edition of the Merck index.

Moreover, acylhydrazones, possessing the -CO-NH–N= motif, are also found in the structure of several drug designs having potential to be used in the therapy of some diseases that are at the top of public health problems, like microbial infections and cardiovascular diseases.

The compound carbonyl cyanide-p-trifluoromethoxyphenylhydrazone (abbreviated as FCCP) is used to uncouple ATP synthesis and reduce oxygen in oxidative phosphorylation in molecular biology.

=== Drug Delivery ===
The concept of pH responsive drug release was first developed in 1981. The hydrazone linkage is often regarded as a prominent pH-responsive chemical bond, first employed in drug delivery for coupling doxorubicin (DOX) to a polymeric carrier. Primarily due to its extremely efficient stimuli responsive behavior to pH change, it has been extensively exploited for drug delivery applications both in vitro and in vivo. Hydrazone-based coupling methods are used in medical biotechnology to couple drugs to targeted antibodies (see ADC), e.g. antibodies against a certain type of cancer cell. The hydrazone-based bond is stable at neutral pH (in the blood) but is rapidly destroyed in the acidic environment of lysosomes of the cell. The drug is subsequently released in the cell, where it exerts its function. Additionally, hydrazines are also very easy to incorporate into polymers which can eventually react with the right aldehyde/keto group to convert them into hydrazone containing conjugates.

=== Imaging Tools ===
Certain hydrazones have been exploited as fluorescent hydrazine probes for detection of highly toxic hydrazines. For instance, many strategies exploit the ease of incorporation of vinyl malononitrile into fluorophores which can then readily react with hydrazines to form hydrazones. The formation of hydrazone, in place of the electron withdrawing cyano groups, inhibits the Intramolecular Charge Transfer processes and thus lead to blue shifted (hypsochromic) emission.

Some rhodamine-based hydrazones show fluorescence only at a certain acidic pH which resembles the lysosomic environment in cancer cells making them useful for cancer cell imaging.

=== Peptidomimetics ===
A variety of peptidomimics, especially azapeptides (which are semicarbazide analogs of natural peptides where the C_{α} has been replaced by NH), are generally synthesized by reductive amination of the hydrazones. The hydrazones act as intermediates which can subsequently be reduced to their hydrazine derivatives thereby enabling the incorporation of additional nitrogen atoms into the peptide backbones. This gives rise to a range of different conformational properties and hydrogen bonding patterns.

Oxime and hydrazone ligations enable the synthesis of head-to-tail cyclic peptides by forming chemoselective linkages between functionalized N- and C-termini, even in the presence of unprotected amino acid side chains. Although these methods can generate rigid macrocycles with unnatural peptide linkages, their application is limited by potential linkage hydrolysis, a mixture of E/Z isomer formation, aldehyde or aminooxy-containing precursor instability, and intermolecular oligomerization from ligation.

=== Molecular Switches ===
A diagram showing reversible E/Z photoisomerization in some of the widely explored classes of hydrazones.

The first ever report of photoisomerization along the C=N of hydrazones dates back to 1976. Ever since then, photoisomerization in various classes of hydrazones have been extensively studied. Upon irradiation, both hypsochromic and bathochromic shifts can be observed depending upon the substituents attached to the hydrazone core. These substitutions also impact several other properties of hydrazone photoswitches like thermal half-lives of the metastable states, photoisomerization quantum yields and photo-fatigue resistance. For example, some of the acyl hydrazones have metastable state thermal half-lives of a few minutes while some arylhydrazones are almost bistable with half lives of thousands of years.

Other than photo-induced isomerization, hydrazones are also known to undergo pH-induced and co-ordination induced conformational switching which gives rise to complicated rotary motors. For example, adding a quinolinyl group to the nitrogen atom and a pyridyl group and an ester group to the carbon atom allows the molecule to adopt four distinct forms. These forms can be reversibly interconverted by changing the pH of the surrounding solution.

=== Dynamic Covalent Chemistry ===
A schematic showing dynamic covalent chemistry and its impact on supramolecular chemistry.

Hydrazones are important dynamic covalent compounds because the C=N bond can undergo reversible formation and exchange under appropriate conditions. This property allows hydrazones to adapt their structures in response to changes in pH, competing building blocks, or other chemical stimuli. Hence, hydrazones have been used to develop dynamic covalent libraries which are capable of accomplishing various functions such as reversible polymerization, molecular recognition, and drug delivery.

=== Sensors and Receptors ===
Hydrazones have been used to analyze inorganic samples since the mid-20^{th} century. One of the earliest hydrazones used was Biscyclohexanone oxalyldihydrazone for colorimetric sensing of Cu^{2+}. Certain rhodamine-based and fluorescein-based hydrazones show on and off fluorescence because of the lactam ring opening of the rhodamine units facilitated by coordination with some metal cations, which make them act as optical chemosensors for these metal cations. By appropriately changing the binding pockets, these chemosensors have been able to bind a range of different metal cations.

The presence of the acidic N-H bond also allows the hydrazone motif to act as a hydrogen bond donor and hence bind to anions. In case of anions, which are also very strong bases, deprotonation of the N-H proton can also occur leading to greater changes in photophysical properties.

== Reactions ==
Hydrazones carry two heteroatoms: a double-bonded "imine nitrogen", and a single-bonded "amine nitrogen". Reactivity arises predominantly from the amine nitrogen, which is basic and nucleophilic. When the amine nitrogen is unsubstituted, the hydrazone can condense with a second equivalent of a carbonyl to give azines, e.g.:

The nitrogen atom also stabilizes the development of negative charge at the double-bonded carbon atom, umpoling the carbonyl. Aldehydic hydrazones undergo electrophilic substitution there; for example benzylium cations react to give the corresponding ketonic hydrazone. In base, they simply deprotonate: similar to oxime dehydration, they eliminate the amine nitrogen to give a nitrile.

The behavior of ketonic hydrazones in base is more complicated, as they have no aldehydic proton to lose. If the amine nitrogen is unsubstituted, then the molecule can undergo the Wolff–Kishner reduction: first, it deprotonates at the amine nitrogen and then reprotonates at the carbon. The resulting hydrazo compound is unstable and decomposes to an alkane, but can be intercepted to perform a Grignard-like addition.

SAMP and RAMP, chiral auxiliaries in the Enders SAMP/RAMP hydrazone alkylation

If the amine nitrogen is instead fully substituted, then the next proton to leave is α to the double-bonded carbon, restoring conventional carbonyl polarity. As such, the amine nitrogen is a convenient location for a chiral auxiliary. This idea is the Enders SAMP/RAMP alkylation and its descendants.On the other hand, N,N-Dialkylhydrazones are valuable synthetic intermediates due to their rich reactivity and highly reactive organometallic derivatives, particularly organolithium species, while maintaining good stability toward transformations elsewhere in the molecule. Their C=N and N–N bonds can be selectively cleaved under hydrolytic, oxidative, reductive, or other conditions to regenerate carbonyl compounds or form primary amines. Hydrolysis, which would require another umpolung, is generally a difficult reaction for hydrazones. Nevertheless, alkyl hydrazones are 10^{2} to 10^{3} fold more susceptible to hydrolysis than analogous oximes. The reaction can be performed reliably with Bismuth chloride ($\ce{BiCl3}$) acid catalysis. Alternatively, acylation of the amine nitrogen, which reduces its basicity, makes hydrolysis possible with tosylic acid.

N-Sulfonyl hydrazones are versatile and safe carbene precursors, enabling diverse carbene-transfer reactions under transition-metal, metal-free, and photocatalytic conditions. Recent advances include enantioselective transformations, novel reactivities, and skeletal editing, some of which are difficult to achieve by other methods.

Aldehyde-based hydrazones have also been explored extensively for C-H functionalization demonstrating how hydrazones can act as substrates/directing groups for C-C and C-heteroatom bond formation, including fluoroalkylation, amination, phosphonation, and azidation.

Other reactions exploit hydrazones' similarity to the diazo and alkene functionalities. In the Shapiro reaction and descendants (hydrazone iodination and the Bamford–Stevens reaction), α elimination converts a sulfonamidrazone to the diazo, which then decomposes to vinyl compounds. In variants on the Lemieux–Johnson oxidation, strong oxidants peroxidize the imine nitrogen's double-bond to carbon, recovering the carbonyl and a nitrosamine.

Some reductants cleave the nitrogen-nitrogen bond.

== Gallery ==
Hydrazones

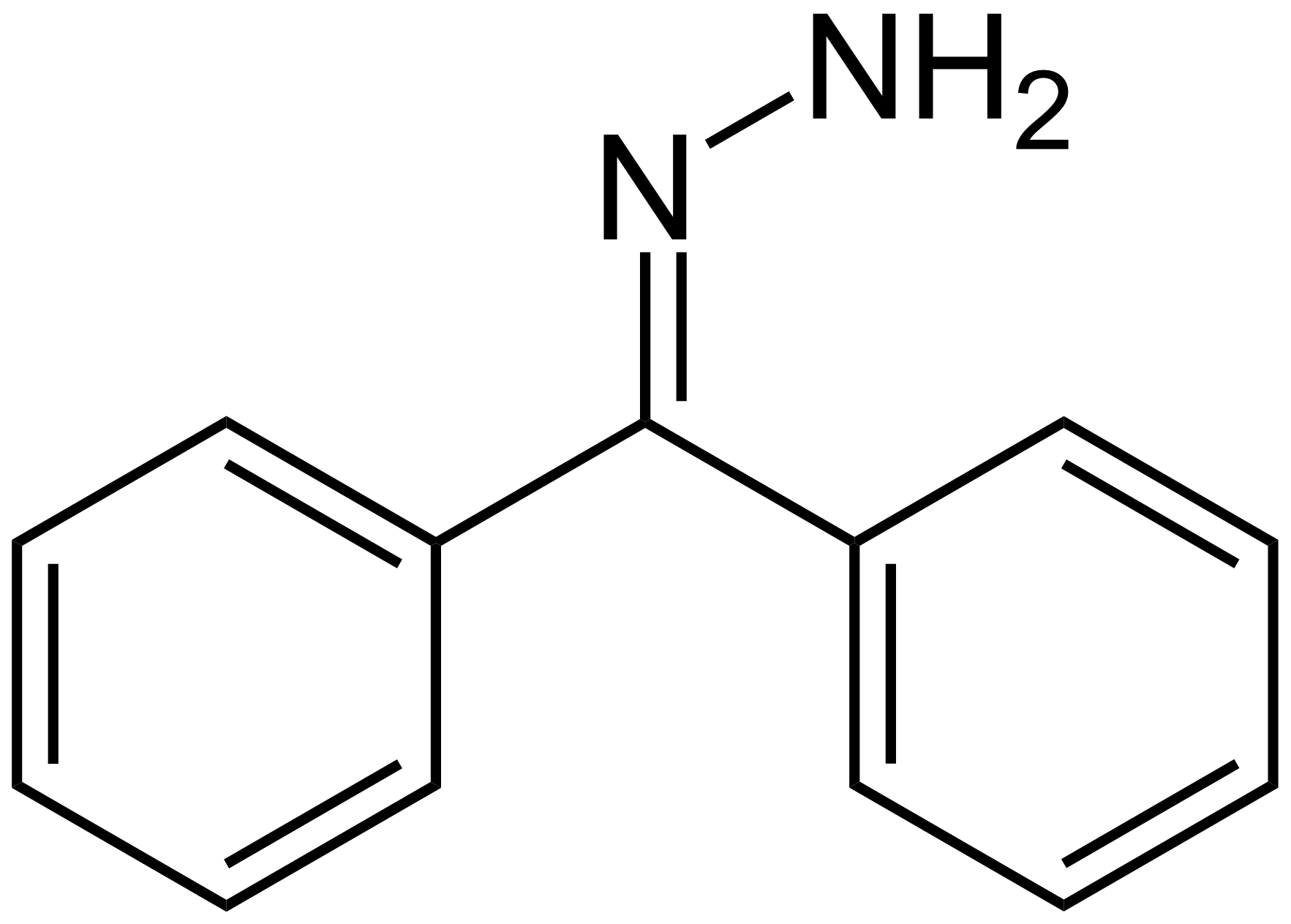
Benzophenone hydrazone, an illustrative hydrazone

Carbonyl cyanide m-chlorophenyl hydrazone

Gyromitrin (acetaldehyde methylformylhydrazone), a toxin

Dihydralazine, an antihypertensive drug

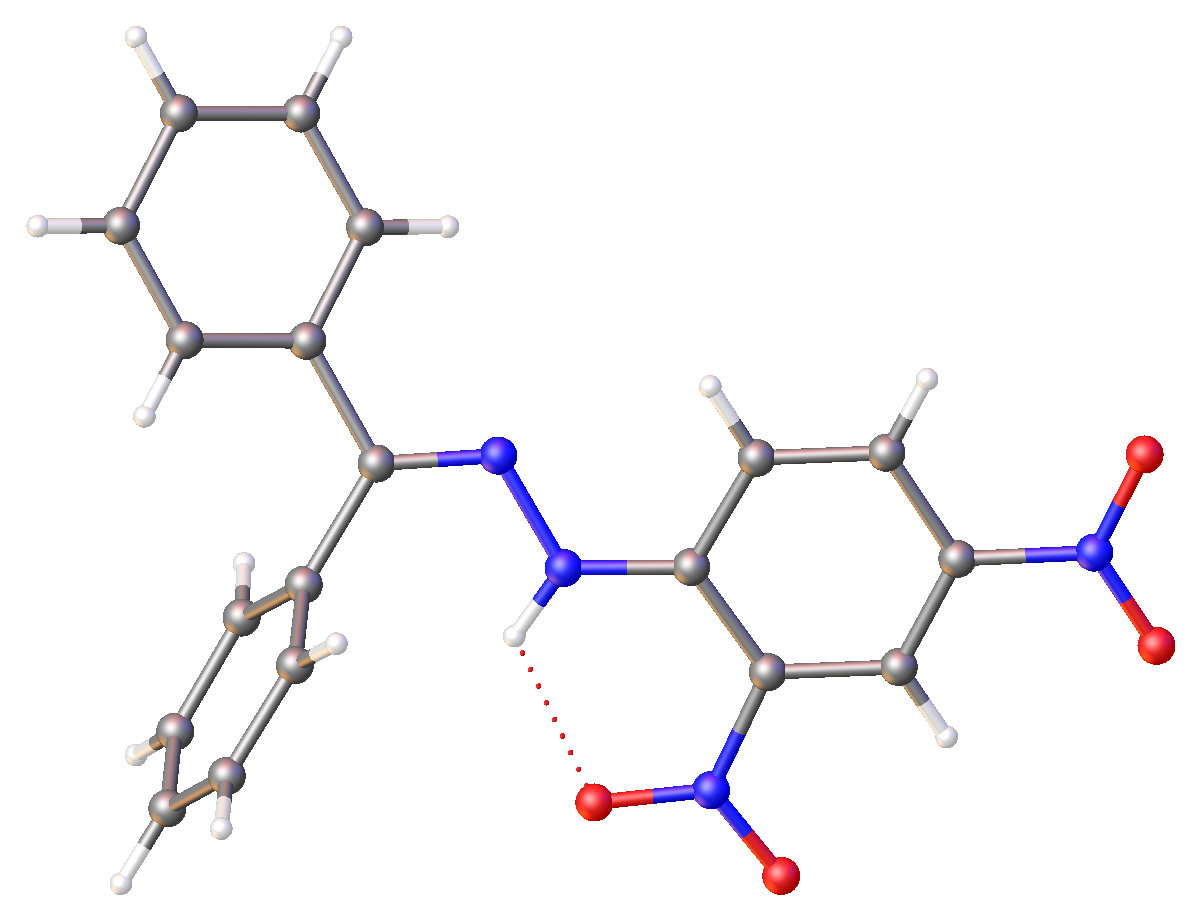
X-ray structure of DNP-derived hydrazone of benzophenone. Selected parameters: C=N, 128 pm; N-N, 138 pm, N-N-C(Ar), 119 pm

== See also ==
- Azo compound
- Imine
- Nitrosamine
- Hydrogenation of carbon–nitrogen double bonds
