= Tosylhydrazone =

A tosylhydrazone in organic chemistry is a functional group with the general structure RR'C=N-NH-Ts where Ts is a tosyl group. Organic compounds having this functional group can be accessed by reaction of an aldehyde or ketone with tosylhydrazine.

As an example camphor tosylhydrazone is synthesised by condensation of camphor and tosylhydrazine in ethanol with hydrochloric acid catalysis.

== Reactions ==
Hydrolysis is the reverse reaction of formation with regeneration of the carbonyl compound.

In the Shapiro reaction tosylhydrazones are used as a leaving group in elimination reactions. This reaction requires a strong base. If sodium methoxide is used as the base the reaction is called a Bamford–Stevens reaction. Tosylhydrazones can be reduced to the corresponding alkanes with reagents such as sodium borohydride and borane.

Tosylhydrazone salts can react with metals to form metal carbenes and used in cyclopropanations and epoxidations. An example of a transition metal-catalyzed cyclopropanation is a synthesis of tranylcypromine, in which the sodium salt of benzaldehyde tosylhydrazone is converted to a rhodium metal carbene through the diazo intermediate.

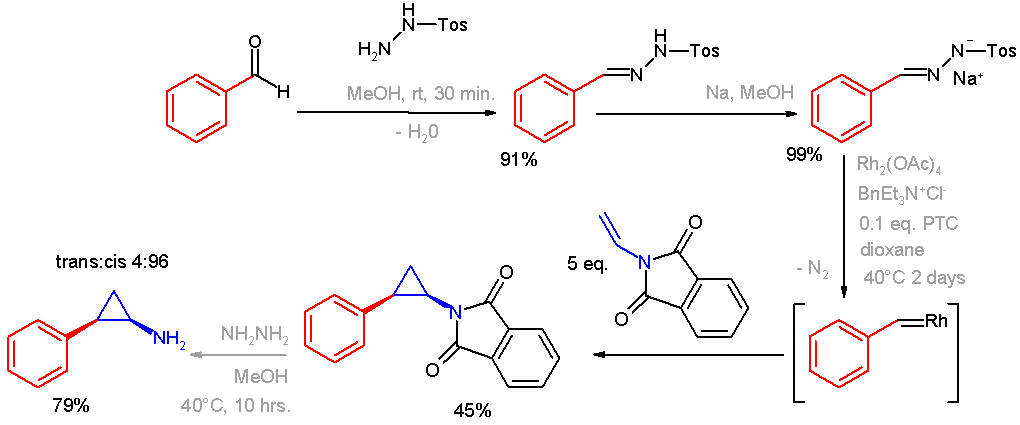

Tosylhydrazones are also starting materials for certain cross-coupling reactions. As part of the catalytic cycle the diazo intermediate formed by decomposition of the tosylhydrazone gives a palladium-carbene complex with the oxidative addition complex of palladium with the aryl halide.
