= Agaritine gamma-glutamyltransferase =

agaritine gamma-glutamyltransferase

Identifiers
- EC no.: 2.3.2.9
- CAS no.: 37257-25-3

Databases
- IntEnz: IntEnz view
- BRENDA: BRENDA entry
- ExPASy: NiceZyme view
- KEGG: KEGG entry
- MetaCyc: metabolic pathway
- PRIAM: profile
- PDB structures: RCSB PDB PDBe PDBsum
- Gene Ontology: AmiGO / QuickGO
Search
- PMC: articles
- PubMed: articles
- NCBI: proteins

In enzymology, an agaritine gamma-glutamyltransferase (EC 2.3.2.9) is an enzyme that catalyzes the chemical reaction

agaritine + acceptor $\rightleftharpoons$ 4-hydroxymethylphenylhydrazine + gamma-L-glutamyl-acceptor

Thus, the two substrates of this enzyme are agaritine and acceptor, whereas its two products are 4-hydroxymethylphenylhydrazine and gamma-L-glutamyl-acceptor.

This enzyme belongs to the family of transferases, specifically the aminoacyltransferases. The systematic name of this enzyme class is (gamma-L-glutamyl)-N1-(4-hydroxymethylphenyl)hydrazine:acceptor gamma-glutamyltransferase. Other names in common use include (gamma-L-glutamyl)-N1-(4-hydroxymethylphenyl)hydrazine:(acceptor), gamma-glutamyltransferase, (gamma-L-glutamyl)-1-N-(4-hydroxymethylphenyl)hydrazine:(acceptor), gamma-glutamyltransferase, (gamma-L-glutamyl)-1-N-(4-hydroxymethylphenyl)hydrazine:acceptor, and gamma-glutamyltransferase.
