= Emil Fischer =

German chemist (1852–1919)

Emil Fischer FRS FRSE FCS
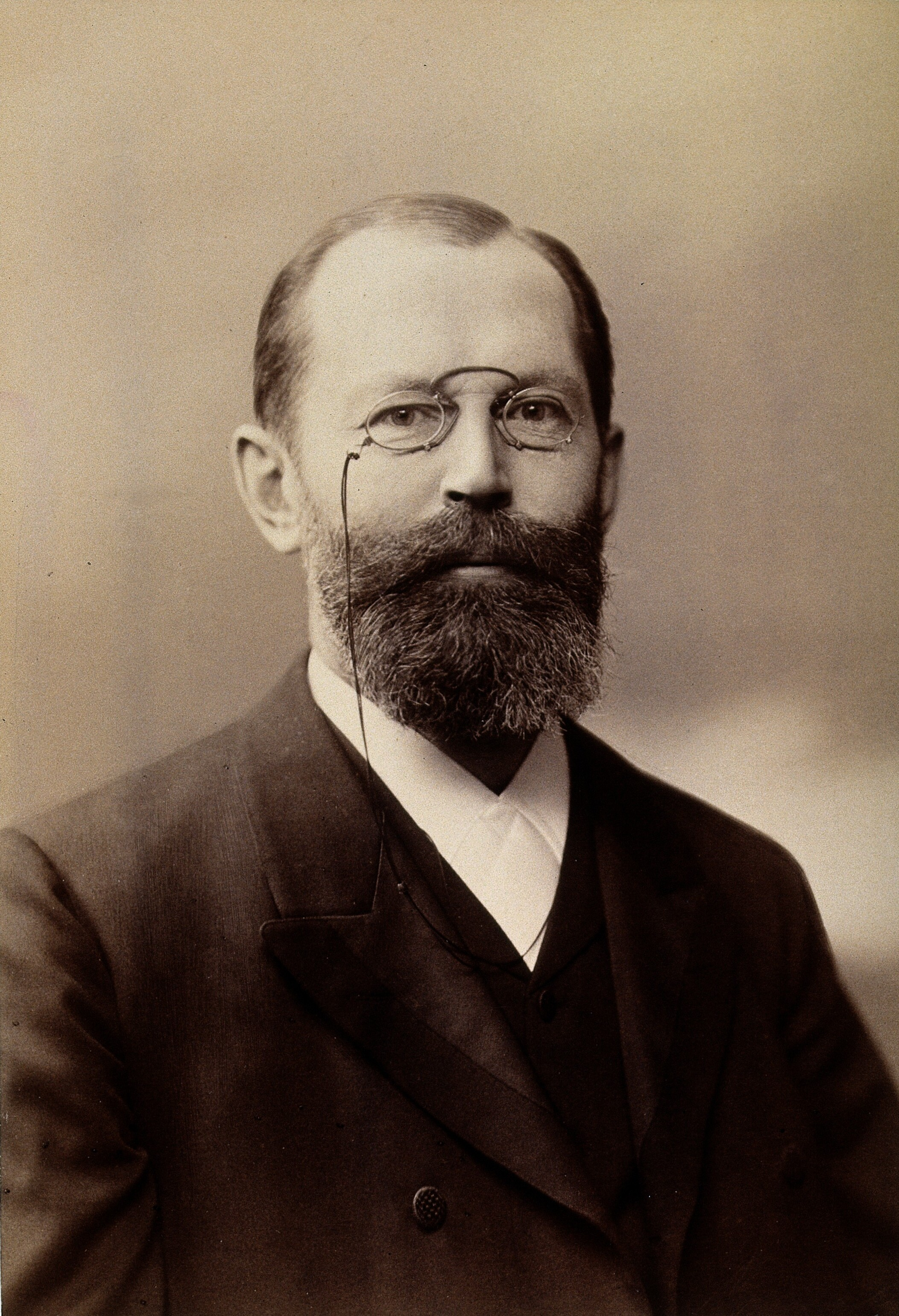
- Fischer, c. 1895
- Born: Hermann Emil Louis Fischer; 9 October 1852; Euskirchen, Prussia
- Died: 15 July 1919 (aged 66); Berlin, Weimar Germany
- Education: University of Bonn; University of Strasbourg
- Known for: Study of sugars and purines
- Awards: Davy Medal (1890); Nobel Prize in Chemistry (1902); Faraday Lectureship Prize (1907); Elliott Cresson Medal (1913)
- Scientific career
- Fields: Chemistry
- Workplaces: Ludwig-Maximilians-Universität München (1875–81); University of Erlangen (1881–88); University of Würzburg (1888–92); Friedrich Wilhelm University of Berlin (1892–1919)
- Doctoral advisor: Adolf von Baeyer
- Other academic advisors: August Kekulé
- Doctoral students: Otto Diels; Walter A. Jacobs; Ludwig Knorr; Oskar Piloty; Otto Ruff; Alfred Stock; Julius Tafel

Hermann Emil Louis Fischer (German: [ˈeːmiːl ˈfɪʃɐ]; 9 October 1852 – 15 July 1919) was a German chemist and 1902 recipient of the Nobel Prize in Chemistry. He discovered the Fischer esterification. He also developed the Fischer projection, a symbolic way of drawing asymmetric carbon atoms. He also hypothesized the lock and key mechanism of enzyme action. He never used his first given name, and was known throughout his life simply as Emil Fischer.

== Early years and career ==
Fischer was born in Euskirchen, near Cologne, the son of Laurenz Fischer, a businessman, and his wife Julie Poensgen. After graduating he wished to study natural sciences, but his father compelled him to work in the family business until determining that his son was unsuitable. Fischer then attended the University of Bonn in 1871, but switched to the University of Strasbourg in 1872. He obtained his doctorate in 1874 under Adolf von Baeyer with his study of phthaleins.

Fischer remained with Baeyer at the University of Strasbourg as an independent research student. In the fall of 1874, he was appointed assistant of the organic laboratory. There in 1875, he discovered and named hydrazines, including unsymmetrical dimethylhydrazine, which became important much later during the Space Race, and phenylhydrazine. The latter compound reacts with carboxylic compounds (aldehydes and ketones) producing crystalline solids. The phenylhydrazones of sugars allowed him to develop his work on the synthesis of sugars and purines, which earned him the Nobel Prize in Chemistry in 1902. Using the phenylhydrazone of pyruvic acid, he developed the synthesis of indole.

In 1875, von Baeyer was asked to succeed Justus von Liebig at the Ludwig-Maximilians-Universität München, and Fischer went there with him to become an assistant in organic chemistry. In 1878, Fischer qualified as a "Privatdozent" at the Ludwig-Maximilians-Universität München, where he was appointed associate professor of analytical chemistry in 1879.

In 1882, he was appointed professor of chemistry at the University of Erlangen and in 1885 at the University of Würzburg. In 1892, he succeeded von Hofmann as professor of chemistry at the Friedrich Wilhelm University of Berlin.

== Research ==
He investigated the derivatives of phenylhydrazines, establishing their relation to the diazo compounds, and he noted the readiness with which they entered into combination with other substances, giving origin to a wealth of hitherto unknown compounds. Of such condensation products undoubtedly the most important are the hydrazones, which result from the interaction with aldehydes and ketones. His observations, published in 1886, that such hydrazones, by treatment with hydrochloric acid or zinc chloride, yielded derivatives of indole, the parent substance of indigo, were a confirmation of the views advanced by von Baeyer on the subject of indigo and the many substances related to it.

He next turned to the fuchsine (then called "rosaniline") magenta dyes, and in collaboration with his cousin Otto Fischer, he published papers in 1878 and 1879 which established that these dyes were derivatives of triphenylmethane. Emil Fischer's next research was concerned with compounds related to uric acid. Here the ground had been broken by von Baeyer, but Fischer greatly advanced the field of knowledge of the purines. In 1881 and 1882 he published papers which established the formulae of uric acid, xanthine, caffeine (achieving the first synthesis), theobromine and some other compounds of this group. After purine itself was isolated, a variety of derivatives were prepared, some of which were patented in view of possible therapeutical applications.

Fischer is particularly noted for his work on sugars. Among his early discoveries related to hydrazine was that phenylhydrazine reacted with sugars to form substances which he named osazones, and which, being highly crystalline and readily formed, served to identify such carbohydrates more definitely than had been previously possible. Later, among other work, he is noted for the organic synthesis of D-(+)-glucose. He showed how to deduce the formulae of the 16 stereoisomeric glucoses, and prepared several stereoisomerides, helping to confirm the Le Bel–Van 't Hoff rule of the asymmetric carbon atom.

In the field of enzymology, Fischer is known for his proposal of "the lock and key" model as a mechanism of substrate binding.

Fischer was also instrumental in the discovery of barbiturates, a class of sedative drugs used for insomnia, epilepsy, anxiety, and anesthesia. Along with the physician Josef von Mering, he helped to launch the first barbiturate sedative, barbital, in 1904. He next carried out pioneering work on proteins. By the introduction of new methods, he succeeded in breaking down the complex albumins into amino acids and other nitrogenous compounds, the constitutions of most of which were known, and by bringing about the recombination of these units, he prepared synthetic peptides which approximated to the natural products. His research group synthesised the first free dipeptide (Glycine-Glycine) in 1901. By 1906 about 65 peptides of different chain length and amino acid composition had been made by his research group. His researches made from 1899 to 1906 were published in 1907 with the title Untersuchungen über Aminosauren, Polypeptides und Proteine. Three years later the total number of peptides exceeded 100, with the longest being an 18 amino acid peptide containing 15 glycine and three leucine units. The 18 amino acid peptide gave the standard responses to tests for proteins used by physiological chemists - a positive Biuret test, precipitation by inorganic salts and cleavage by proteolytic enzymes

== Personal life ==
Fischer married Agnes Gerlach in 1888. She died seven years later, leaving him a widower with three sons. The younger two died during their military service in World War I, but the oldest, Hermann, became an organic chemist. Fischer died in Berlin on 15 July 1919 at the age of 66. He was Protestant

== Honours, awards, and legacy ==
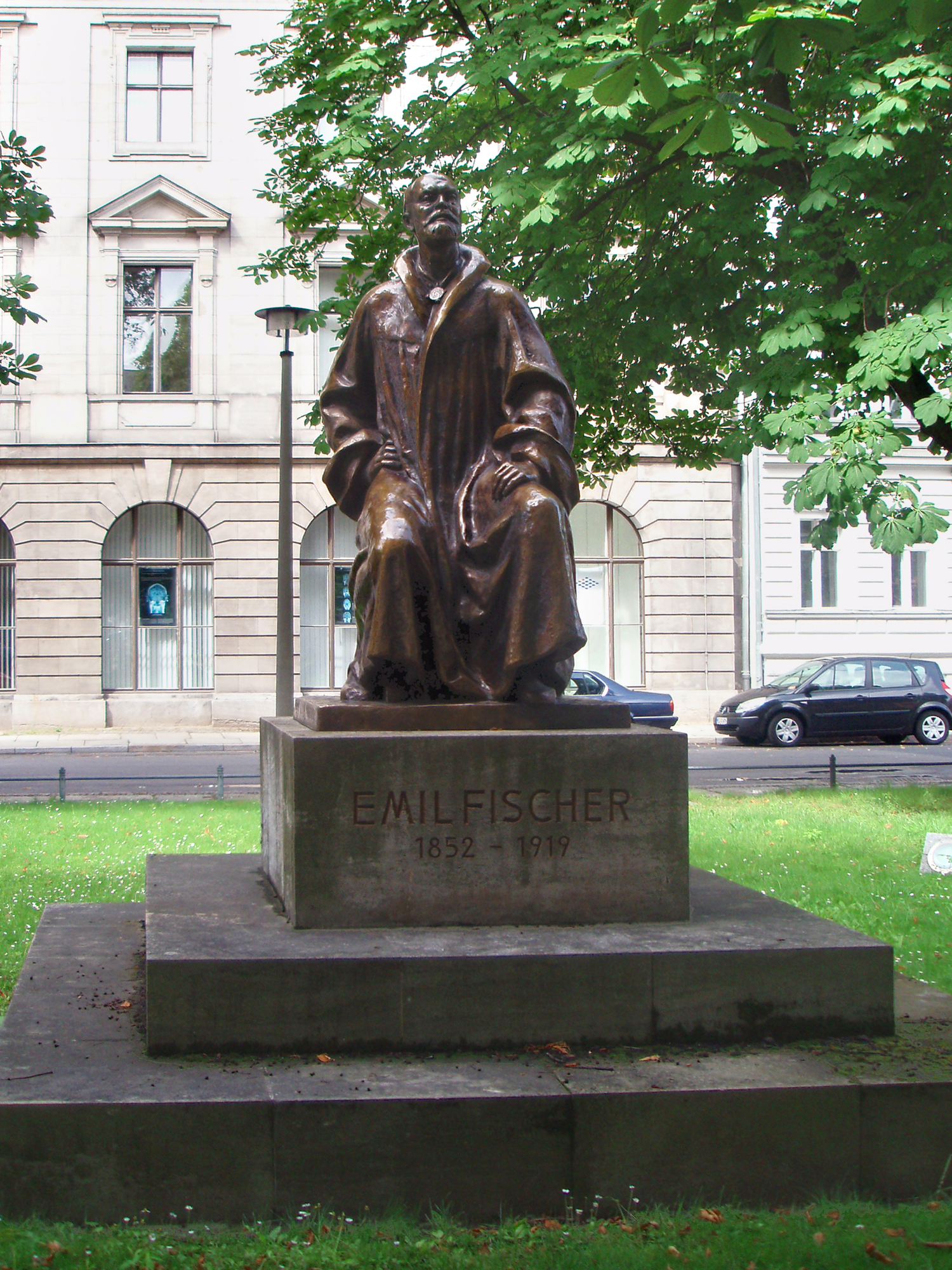
Monument to Emil Fischer in Berlin

In 1897 he put forward the idea to create the International Atomic Weights Commission. Fischer was elected a Foreign Member of the Royal Society (ForMemRS) in 1899. He was awarded the 1902 Nobel Prize in chemistry "in recognition of the extraordinary services he has rendered by his work on sugar and purine syntheses." He was elected an International Member of the United States National Academy of Sciences in 1904, an International Honorary Member of the American Academy of Arts and Sciences in 1908, and an International Member of the American Philosophical Society in 1909.

Many names of chemical reactions and concepts are named after him:

- Fischer indole synthesis
- Fischer projection
- Fischer oxazole synthesis
- Fischer peptide synthesis
- Fischer phenylhydrazine and oxazone reaction
- Fischer–Speier esterification
- Fischer glycosidation
- Kiliani–Fischer synthesis

The Fischer–Tropsch process is named after Franz Emil Fischer, who headed the Max Planck Institute for Coal Research in Mülheim an der Ruhr, and is unrelated to Fischer.
