= Robert H. Shapiro =

American chemist (1935–2004)

- Born: July 18, 1935; New Haven, Connecticut, U.S.
- Died: August 21, 2004 (aged 69); Harrisonburg, Virginia, U.S.
- Education: University of Connecticut and Stanford University
- Known for: Shapiro reaction
- Scientific career
- Workplaces: University of Colorado at Boulder, James Madison University, United States Naval Academy

Robert H. Shapiro (July 18, 1935 – August 21, 2004) was an American chemist and the first academic provost of the United States Naval Academy.

== Education and career ==
After serving with both the United States Navy and the United States Marine Corps, Shapiro earned degrees in chemistry and pharmacy at the University of Connecticut, and then went to Stanford University, where he received a Ph.D. in chemistry. In 1965 he became professor at the University of Colorado at Boulder, and from 1980 until his retirement in 1989 he worked at the James Madison University as dean of the College of Letters and Sciences and as vice-provost of the university. He then became dean, and then provost, at the United States Naval Academy. Shapiro served as the academy's chief academic officer until his retirement in 1998.

He served as the editor of the journal Organic Mass Spectroscopy (now the Journal of Mass Spectrometry) for ten years. The Shapiro reaction, which he discovered in 1967, is named for him.
