= Krapcho decarboxylation =

Chemical reaction of esters with halide anions

Named after	A. Paul Krapcho
Reaction type	Substitution reaction

Identifiers
RSC ontology ID	RXNO:0000507

Krapcho decarboxylation is a chemical reaction used to manipulate certain organic esters. This reaction applies to esters with a beta electron-withdrawing group (EWG).

The reaction proceeds by nucleophilic dealkylation of the ester by the halide followed by decarboxylation, followed by hydrolysis of the resulting stabilized carbanion.

ZCH_{2}CO_{2}CH_{3} + I^{−} + H_{2}O → ZCH_{3} + CH_{3}I + CO_{2} + OH^{−}

== Reaction conditions ==
The reaction is carried in dipolar aprotic solvents such as dimethyl sulfoxide (DMSO) at high temperatures, often around 150 °C.

A variety of salts assist in the reaction including NaCl, LiCl, KCN, and NaCN. It is suggested that the salts were not necessary for reaction, but greatly accelerates the reaction when compared to the reaction with water alone.

The ester must contain an EWG in the beta position . The reaction works best with methyl esters which are more susceptible to S_{N}2 reactions.

== Mechanisms ==
The mechanisms are still not fully uncovered. However, the following are suggested mechanisms for two different substituents:

α,α-Disubstituted ester

For an α,α-disubstituted ester, it is suggested that the anion in the salt attacks the R_{3} in an S_{N}2 fashion, kicking off R_{3} and leaving a negative charge on the oxygen. Then, decarboxylation occurs to produce a carbanion intermediate. The intermediate picks up a hydrogen from water to form the products.

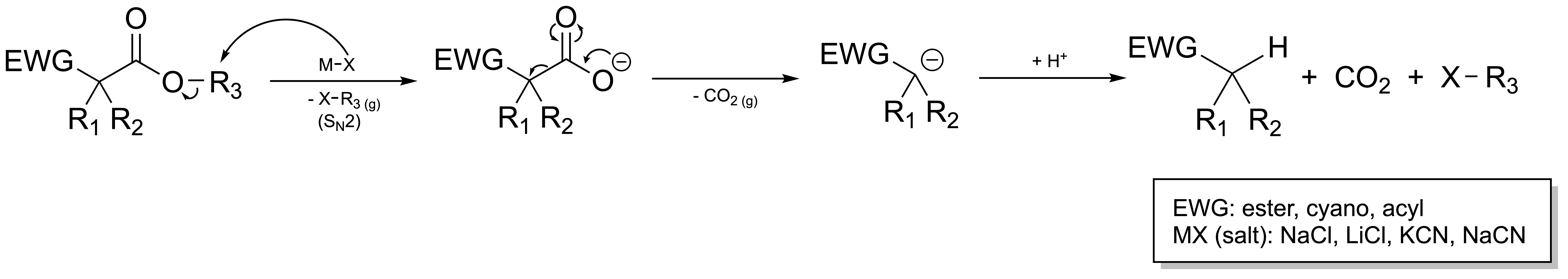
The suggested reaction mechanism of α,α-disubstituted esters in the Krapcho decarboxylation reaction. R_{1}, R_{2}, and R_{3} are any carbon containing substituents.

The byproducts of the reaction (X-R_{3} and CO_{2}) are often lost as gases, which helps drive the reaction; entropy increases and Le Chatelier's principle takes place.

α-Monosubstituted ester

For an α-monosubstituted ester, it is speculated that the anion in the salt attacks the carbonyl group to form a negative charge on the oxygen, which then cleaves off the cyanoester. With the addition of water, the cyanoester is then hydrolyzed to form CO_{2} and alcohol, and the carbanion intermediate is protonated.

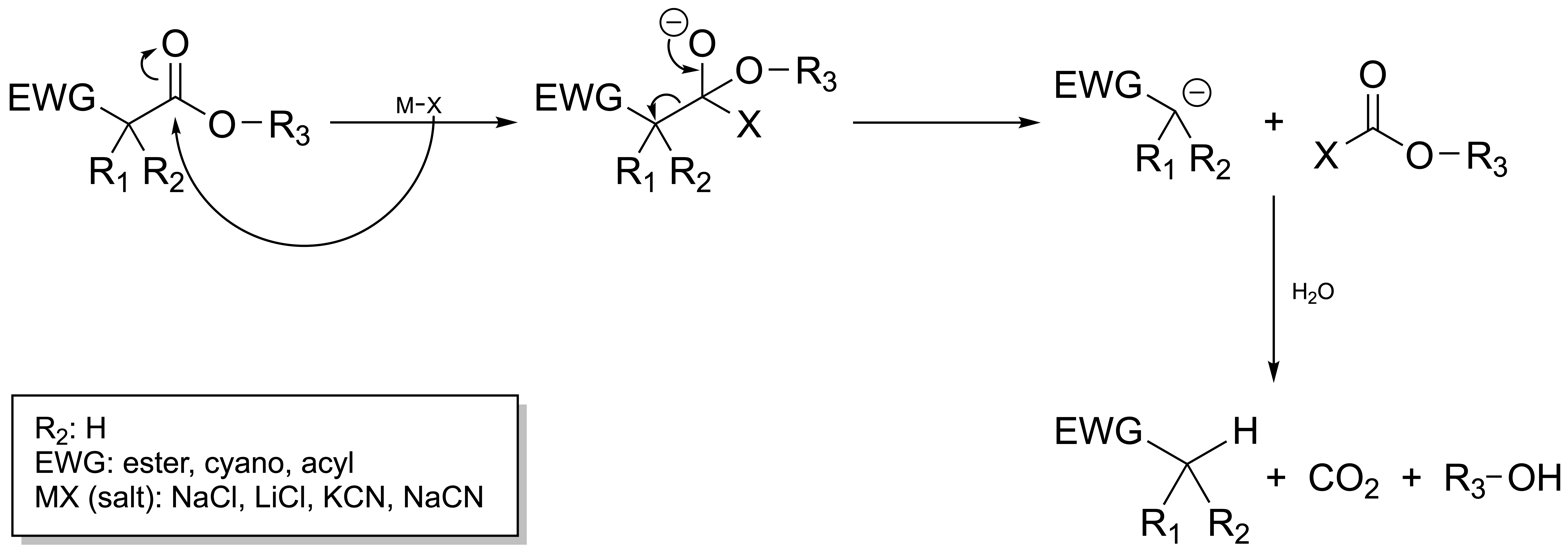
The suggested reaction mechanism of α-monosubstituted esters in the Krapcho decarboxylation reaction. R_{2} is a hydrogen.

The byproduct of this reaction (CO_{2}) is also lost as gas, which helps drive the reaction; entropy increases and Le Chatelier's principle takes place.

== Advantages ==
The Krapcho decarboxylation is a comparatively simpler method to manipulate malonic esters because it cleaves only one ester group, without affecting the other ester group. The conventional method involves saponification to form carboxylic acids, followed by decarboxylation to cleave the carboxylic acids, and an esterification step to regenerate the esters. Additionally, Krapcho decarboxylation avoids harsh alkaline or acidic conditions.
