= Amidrazone =

The two tautomeric forms of amidrazones: hydrazide imide (left) and amide hydrazone (right)

Amidrazones are a class of chemical compounds formally derived from carboxylic acids. Amidrazones can exists in two tautomeric forms: hydrazide imides (RC(=NH)NHNH_{2}) and amide hydrazones (RC(NH_{2})=NNH_{2}).

== Uses ==
Some amidrazones have been employed as insecticides. They were known in 1993 by an agent of Dow Chemical for their low undesirable toxicity, low production cost, and effectiveness against insects resistant to known insecticides. Compounds of amidrazones were employed as early as 1993 for controlling plant-destructive insects in crops of cultivated plants, ornamentals, and forestry.
