= Kiliani–Fischer synthesis =

Method for synthesizing longer monosaccharides

The Kiliani–Fischer synthesis, named for German chemists Heinrich Kiliani and Emil Fischer, is a method for synthesizing monosaccharides. It proceeds via synthesis and hydrolysis of a cyanohydrin, followed by reduction of the intermediate acid to the aldehyde, thus elongating the carbon chain of an aldose by one carbon atom while preserving stereochemistry on all the previously present chiral carbons. The new chiral carbon is produced with both stereochemistries, so the product of a Kiliani–Fischer synthesis is a mixture of two diastereomeric sugars, called epimers. For example, D-arabinose is converted to a mixture of D-glucose and D-mannose.

== Classic Kiliani–Fischer synthesis ==
The original version of the Kiliani–Fischer synthesis proceeds through cyanohydrin and aldonic acid lactone intermediates. The first step is to react the starting sugar with aqueous cyanide (typically NaCN); the cyanide undergoes nucleophilic addition to the carbonyl group of the sugar (while sugars tend to exist mainly as cyclic hemiacetal, they are always in chemical equilibrium with their open-chain aldehyde or ketone forms, and in the case of these aldoses it is that aldehyde form that reacts in this synthesis). The cyanohydrin resulting from this addition is heated in water, which hydrolyzes the cyanide into a carboxylic acid group that quickly reacts with itself to form a more stable lactone. Now there are two diastereomeric lactones in the reaction mixture. They are separated (by chromatography, partitioned into different solvents, or any of the numerous other separation methods) and then the desired lactone is reduced with a sodium amalgam. As illustrated below, D-arabinose is converted to a mixture of D-glucononitrile and D-mannononitrile, which is then converted to D-gluconolactone and D-mannonolactone, separated, and reduced to D-glucose or D-mannose. The chemical yield by this method is estimated to be around 30%.

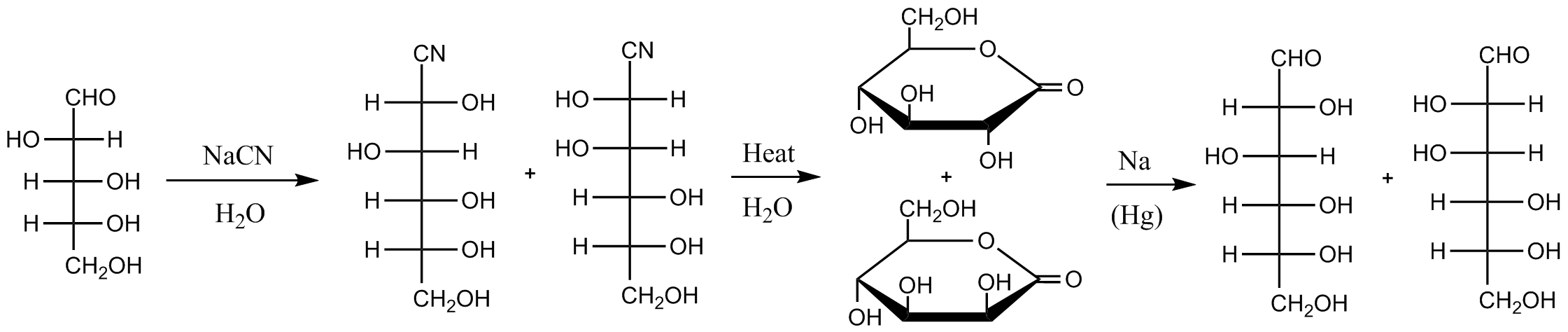
Steps of the Kiliani-Fischer synthesis of D-glucose and its C-2 epimer, D-mannose, from D-arabinose

== Improved version ==
More recently, an improved reduction method has been developed that produces somewhat higher yields of the larger sugars. Instead of conversion of the cyanohydrin to a lactone, the cyanohydrin is reduced with hydrogen, using palladium on barium sulfate as the catalyst and water as the solvent, to form an imine. Due to the presence of water, the imine quickly hydrolyzes to form an aldehyde, thus the final sugars are produced in just two steps rather than three. The separation of the isomers is then performed at the stage of the sugar products themselves rather than at the lactone intermediates. The special catalyst is needed to avoid further reduction of the aldehyde group to a hydroxyl group, which would yield an alditol. These catalysts that limit hydrogenation to one step are called poisoned catalysts; Lindlar palladium is another example. The reactions below illustrate this improved method for the conversion of L-threose to L-lyxose and L-xylose.

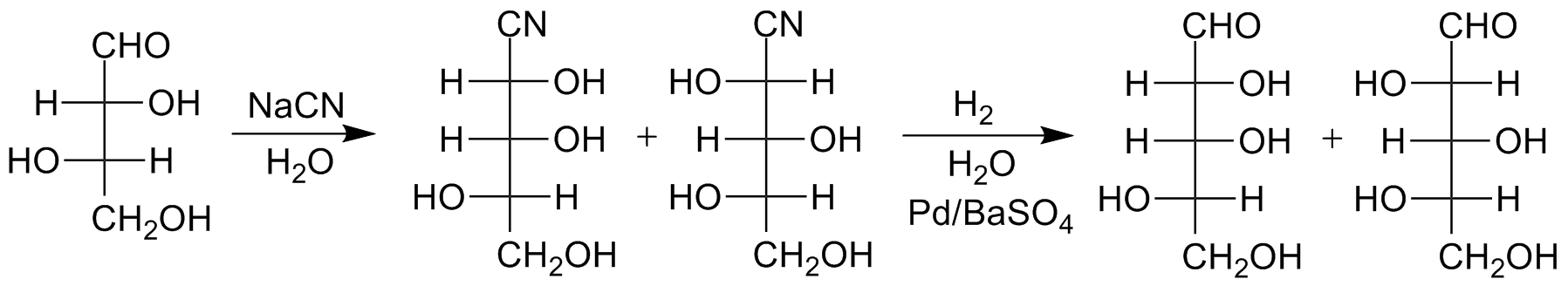
An improved version of the Kiliani–Fischer synthesis

== Uses and limitations ==
Both enantiomers of glyceraldehyde are commercially available, so one can access any stereoisomer of any chain-length aldose by an appropriate number of repeated applications of the Kiliani–Fischer synthesis. The triose D-glyceraldehyde (1) leads to the tetroses D-erythrose (2a) and D-threose (2b). Those lead to the pentoses D-ribose (3a) and D-arabinose (3b), and D-xylose (3c) and D-lyxose (3d), respectively. The next iteration leads to the hexoses D-allose (4a) and D-altrose (4b), D-glucose (4c) and D-mannose (4d), D-gulose (4e) and D-idose (4f), and D-galactose (4g) and D-talose (4h). The D-heptoses and beyond are available by continuing the sequence, and enantiomeric L series is available by starting the sequence with L-glyceraldehyde.

Successive iterations of the Kiliani–Fischer synthesis allow access to all diastereomers of any chain-length for a specific absolute stereochemistry of the initial reactant

In practice, the Kiliani–Fischer synthesis is usually used for production of sugars that are difficult or impossible to obtain from natural sources. While it does provide access to every possible stereoisomer of any desired aldose, the process is limited by its low yield and use of toxic reagents. In addition, the process requires having a supply of the previous sugar in the series, which may itself require substantial synthetic work if it is not readily available. For example, if successive iterations of the Kiliani–Fischer synthesis are used, the overall yield drops approximately exponentially for each additional iteration.

The process only provides direct access to aldoses, whereas some sugars of interest may instead be ketoses. Some ketoses may be accessible from similar aldoses by isomerization via an enediol intermediate; for example, on standing in aqueous base, glucose, fructose, and mannose will slowly interconvert since they share an enediol form. (See Lobry de Bruyn–van Ekenstein transformation). Some unusual sugars are also accessible via aldol addition.

== See also ==
- Homologation reactions
- Wohl degradation
- Ruff degradation
