= Osazone =

Class of chemical compounds

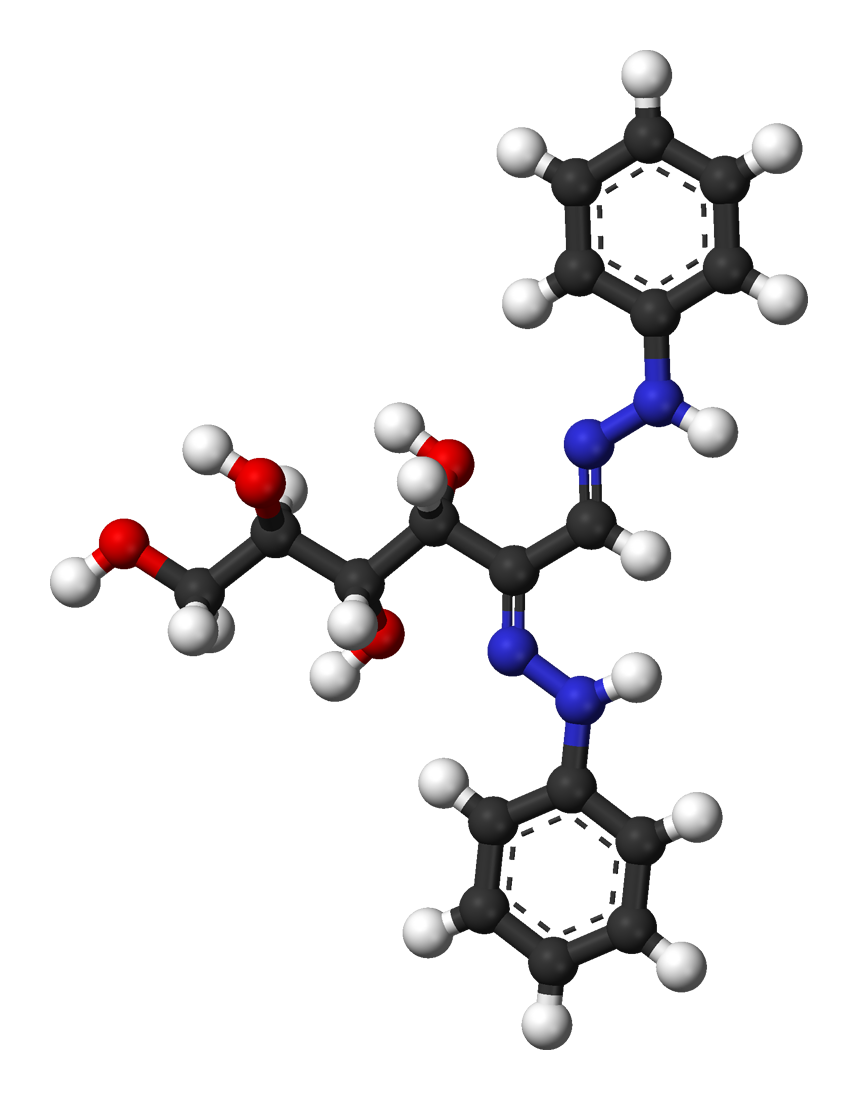
Ball-and-stick model of glucosazone

Osazone are a class of carbohydrate derivatives found in organic chemistry formed when reducing sugars are reacted with excess of phenylhydrazine at boiling temperatures.

== Formation ==
Osazone formation was developed by Emil Fischer, who used the reaction as a test to identify monosaccharides.

The formation of a pair of hydrazone functionalities involves both oxidation and condensation reactions. Since the reaction requires a free carbonyl group, only "reducing sugars" participate. Sucrose, which is nonreducing, does not form an osazone.

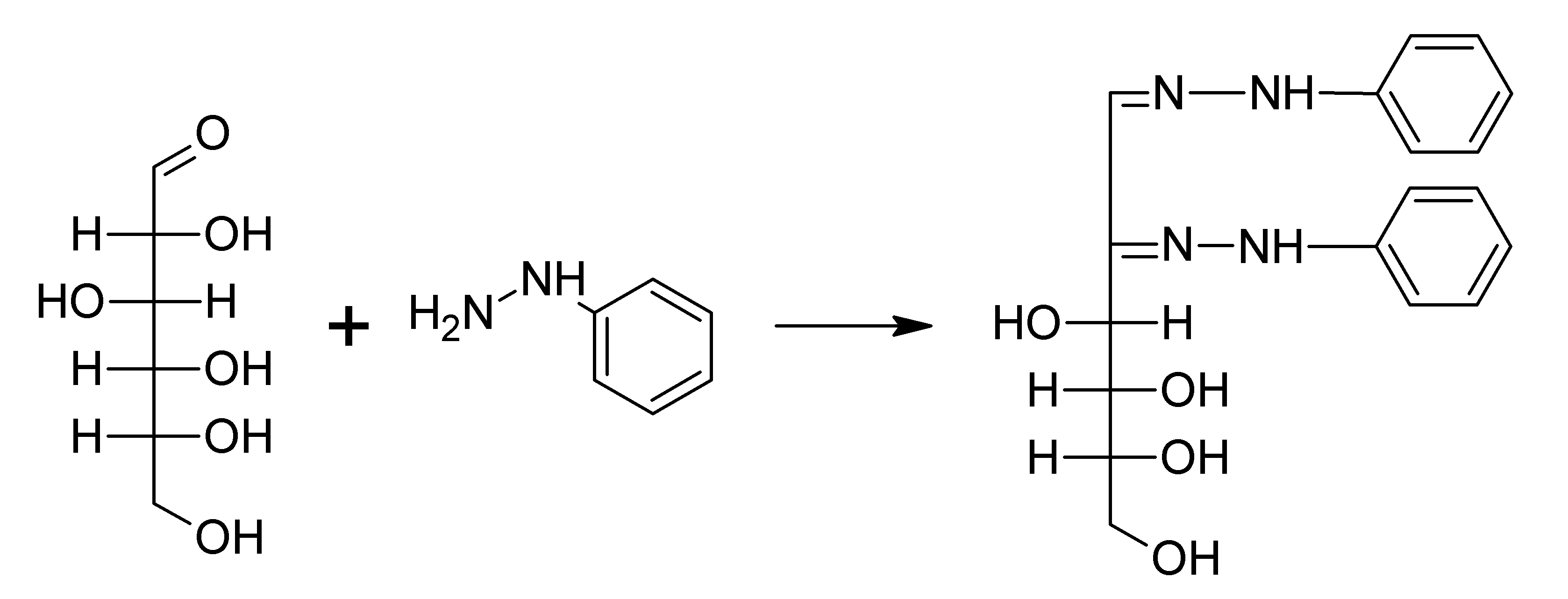
A typical reaction showing the formation of an osazone. D-glucose reacts with phenylhydrazine to give glucosazone. The same product is obtained from fructose and mannose.

General steps in osazone formation

== Appearance ==
Osazones are highly coloured and crystalline compounds. Osazones are readily distinguished.

- Maltosazone (from maltose) forms petal-shaped crystals.
- Lactosazone (from lactose) forms powder puff-shaped crystals.
- Galactosazone (from galactose) forms rhombic-plate shaped crystals.
- Glucosazone (from glucose, fructose or mannose) forms broomstick or needle-shaped crystals.

== Historic references ==
- Fischer, Emil (1908). "Schmelzpunkt des Phenylhydrazins und einiger Osazone". Berichte der Deutschen Chemischen Gesellschaft. 41: 73–77. doi:10.1002/cber.19080410120.
- Fischer, Emil (1894). "Ueber einige Osazone und Hydrazone der Zuckergruppe". Berichte der Deutschen Chemischen Gesellschaft. 27 (2): 2486–2492. doi:10.1002/cber.189402702249.
- Barry, VINCENT C.; Mitchell, PW (1955). "Mechanism of Osazone Formation". Nature. 175 (4448): 220. Bibcode:1955Natur.175..220B. doi:10.1038/175220a0. PMID 13235861.
