= Thomas Stevens Stevens =

Scottish organic chemist

Professor Thomas Stevens Stevens FRS FRSE

Professor of Chemistry, University of Sheffield
- In office 1963–1966

Personal details
- Born: 8 October 1900 Renfrew, Scotland
- Died: 12 November 2000 (aged 100)
- Occupation: Organic chemist

Thomas Stevens Stevens (8 October 1900 – 12 November 2000) was a Scottish organic chemist. He was affectionately known as T.S.S. or Tommy Stevens.

== Life ==
He was born in Renfrew on 8 October 1900, the only son of John Stevens and his wife, Jane Irving. His father was a design engineer and Production Director of William Simons & Co. shipbuilders in Renfrew. He was home educated by his mother (a former schoolteacher) until 1908 then educated at Paisley Grammar School. In 1915 he moved to Glasgow Academy and completed his education there in 1917.

He studied Science at Glasgow University under a Taylor Open Bursary, graduating BSc in 1921. He continued at Glasgow as a researcher and as assistant to Horwood Tucker. In 1923 he went to Oxford University to study under Prof William Henry Perkin Jr, gaining his first doctorate (PhD) in 1925.

He returned to Glasgow University in 1925 as a university assistant. In 1928 he became a teaching assistant and in 1933 a Lecturer which he continued until 1947. In 1947 he moved to Sheffield University as a Senior Lecturer in Organic Chemistry. He became a Reader in 1949 and became Professor in 1963.

In 1963 he was elected a Fellow of the Royal Society of London In 1964 he was elected a Fellow of the Royal Society of Edinburgh. His proposers were Peter Pauson, James Bell, Ian Dawson and John Monteath Robertson.

He retired in 1966. In 1985 he was awarded an honorary doctorate (DSc) from Glasgow University.

He died on 12 November 2000, a few weeks after his 100th birthday.

== Family ==
In 1949 he married Janet Wilson Forsyth (d. 1994).
