= Phenylhydrazine =

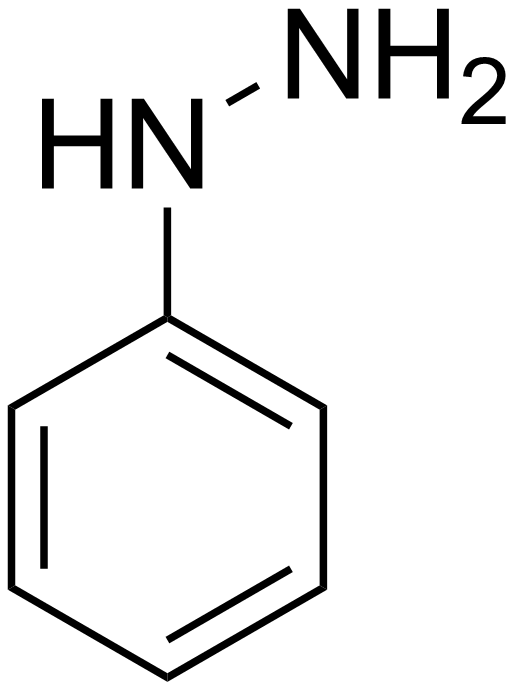
- Phenylhydrazine

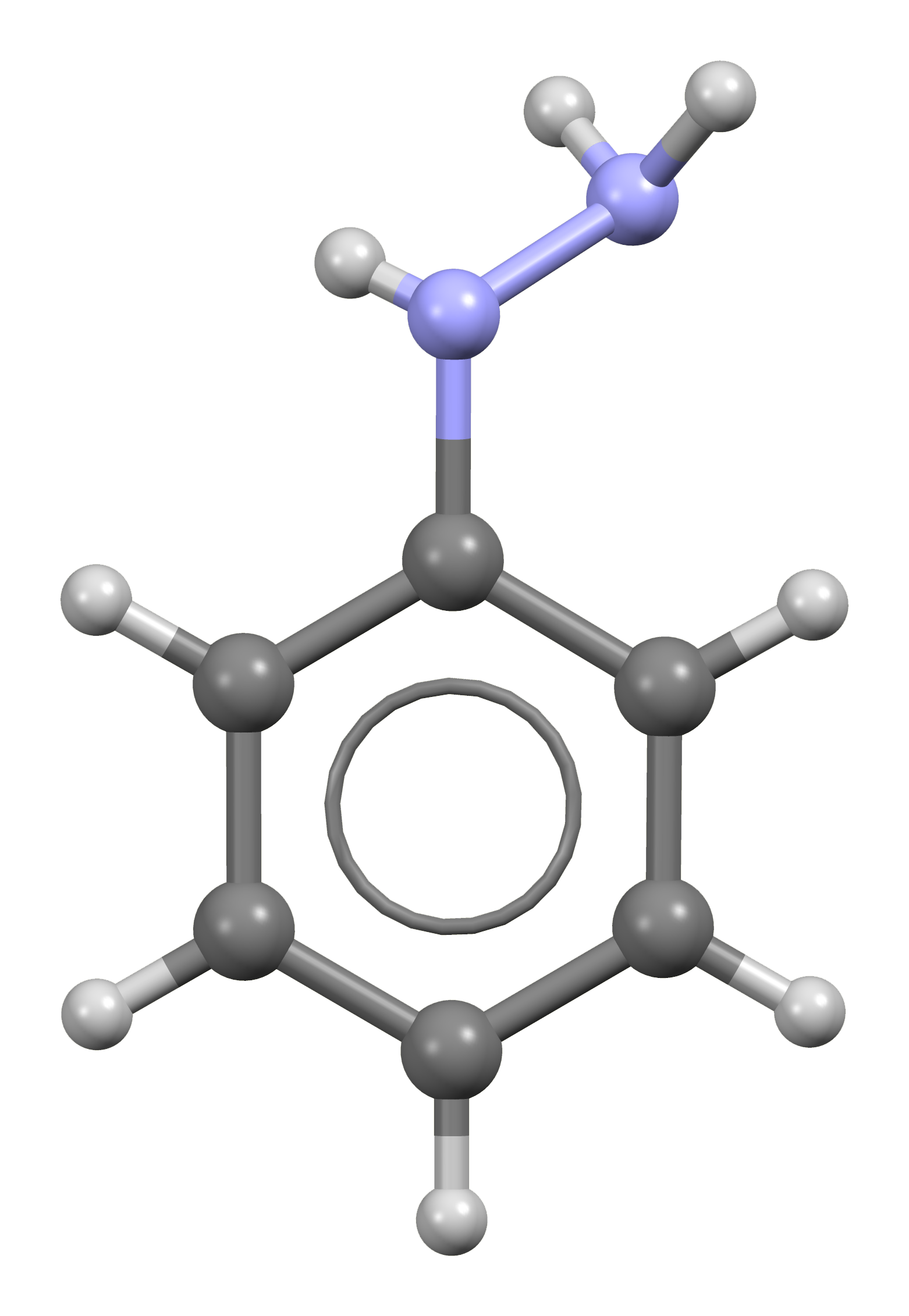
Ball-and-stick model of phenylhydrazine
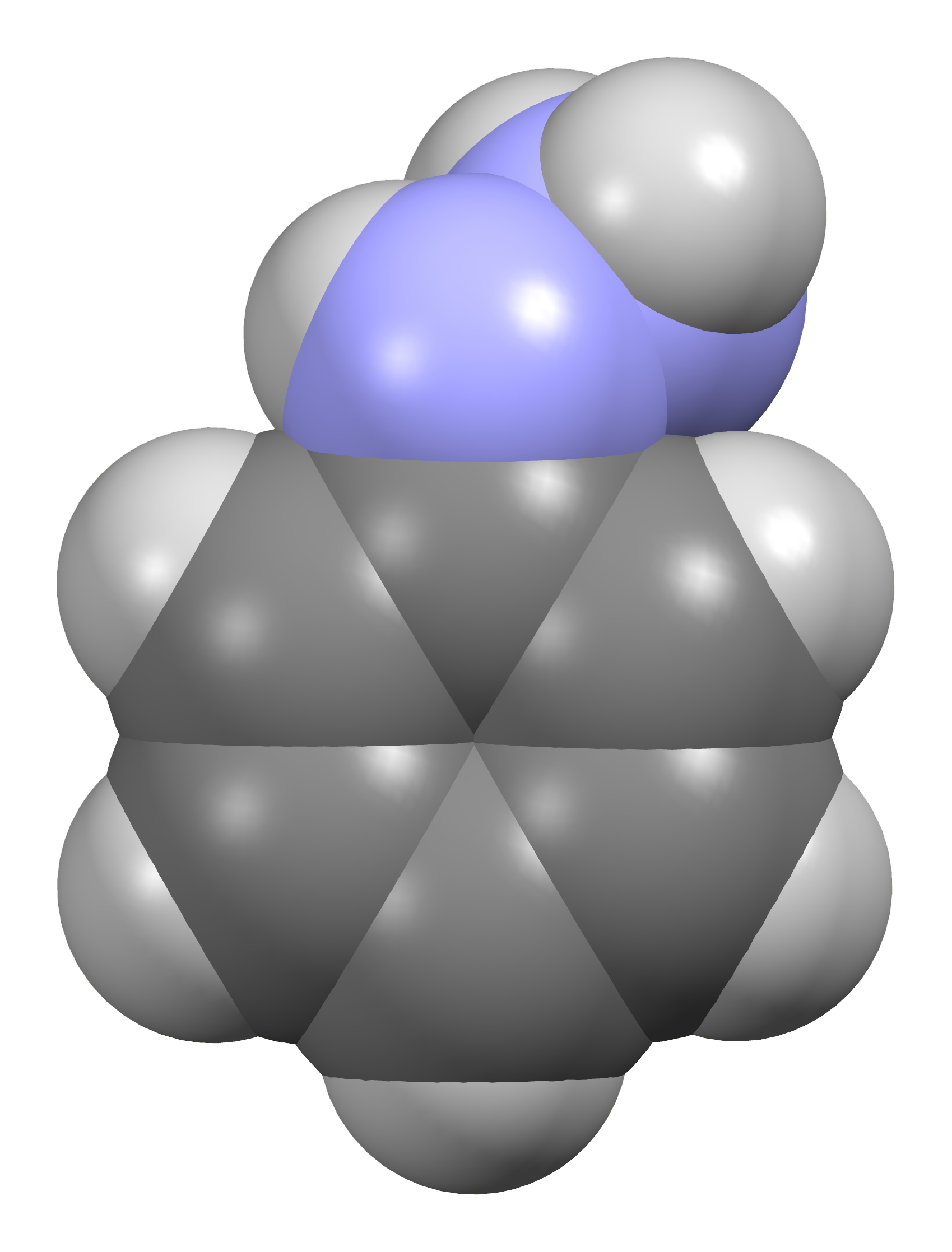
Space-filling model of phenylhydrazine

Names
- Preferred IUPAC name Phenylhydrazine
- Other names Hydrazinobenzene

Identifiers
CAS Number	100-63-0
3D model (JSmol)	Interactive image
ChEBI	CHEBI:27924
ChEMBL	ChEMBL456807
ChemSpider	7235
ECHA InfoCard	100.002.612
KEGG	C02304
PubChem CID	7516
UNII	064F424C9K
CompTox Dashboard (EPA)	DTXSID8021147
- InChI: InChI=1S/C6H8N2/c7-8-6-4-2-1-3-5-6/h1-5,8H,7H2 Key: HKOOXMFOFWEVGF-UHFFFAOYSA-N; InChI=1/C6H8N2/c7-8-6-4-2-1-3-5-6/h1-5,8H,7H2 Key: HKOOXMFOFWEVGF-UHFFFAOYAN
- SMILES: NNc1ccccc1

Properties
Chemical formula	C_{6}H_{5}NHNH_{2}
Molar mass	108.144 g·mol^{−1}
Appearance	Colorless to pale-yellow liquid or solid
Odor	faint, aromatic
Density	1.0978 g/cm^{3}
Melting point	19.5 °C (67.1 °F; 292.6 K) (24 °C for hemihydrate)
Boiling point	243.5 °C (470.3 °F; 516.6 K) (decomposition)
Vapor pressure	0.04 mmHg (25°C)
Magnetic susceptibility (χ)	−67.82·10^{−6} cm^{3}/mol

Hazards
NFPA 704 (fire diamond)	3 2 3
Flash point	88 °C; 190 °F; 361 K
- Lethal dose or concentration (LD, LC)
LD_{50} (median dose)	188 mg/kg (rat, oral); 175 mg/kg (mouse, oral); 80 mg/kg (rabbit, oral); 80 mg/kg (guinea pig, oral); 200-250 mg/kg (dog, oral)
- NIOSH (US health exposure limits)
PEL (Permissible)	TWA 5 ppm (22 mg/m^{3}) [skin]
REL (Recommended)	Ca C 0.14 ppm (0.6 mg/m^{3}) [2-hr] [skin]
IDLH (Immediate danger)	Ca [15 ppm]
- Except where otherwise noted, data are given for materials in their standard state (at 25 °C [77 °F], 100 kPa). verify (what is ?) Infobox references

Phenylhydrazine is the chemical compound with the formula C_{6}H_{5}NHNH_{2}. It is often abbreviated as PhNHNH_{2}. It is also found in edible mushrooms.

== Properties ==
Phenylhydrazine forms monoclinic prisms that melt to an oil around room temperature which may turn yellow to dark red upon exposure to air. Phenylhydrazine is miscible with ethanol, diethyl ether, chloroform and benzene. It is sparingly soluble in water.

== Preparation ==
Phenylhydrazine is prepared by reacting aniline with sodium nitrite in the presence of hydrogen chloride to form the diazonium salt, which is subsequently reduced using sodium sulfite in the presence of sodium hydroxide to form the final product.

== History ==
Phenylhydrazine was the first hydrazine derivative characterized, reported by Hermann Emil Fischer in 1875. He prepared it by reduction of a phenyl diazonium salt using sulfite salts. Fischer used phenylhydrazine to characterize sugars via formation of hydrazones known as osazones with the sugar aldehyde. He also demonstrated in this first paper many of the key properties recognized for hydrazines.

== Uses ==
Phenylhydrazine is used to prepare indoles by the Fischer indole synthesis, which are intermediates in the synthesis of various dyes and pharmaceuticals.

Phenylhydrazine is used to form phenylhydrazones of natural mixtures of simple sugars in order to render the differing sugars easily separable from each other.

This molecule is also used to induce acute hemolytic anemia in animal models.

== Safety ==
Exposure to phenylhydrazine may cause contact dermatitis, hemolytic anemia, and liver damage.
