= Hydrazinium chloride =

Names
- IUPAC name Diazanium chloride
- Other names: Hydrazinium chloride; Hydrazinium monochloride; Hydrazine monohydrochloride; Diazane hydrochloride; Hydrazine hydrochloride; Hydrazine hydrochloride (1:1)

Identifiers
| CAS Number | 5341-61-7 |
| 3D model (JSmol) | Interactive image |
| ECHA InfoCard | 100.018.323 |
| EC Number | 220-154-4 |
| PubChem CID | 115031 |
| UNII | SAC70ZC332 |
| CompTox Dashboard (EPA) | DTXSID101033221 |
- InChI: InChI=1S/ClH.H4N2/c;1-2/h1H;1-2H2 Key: BIVUUOPIAYRCAP-UHFFFAOYSA-N
- SMILES: [NH3+]N.[Cl-]

Properties
| Chemical formula | [NH_{2}NH_{3}]Cl |
| Molar mass | 68.50 g·mol^{−1} |
| Appearance | Colorless hygroscopic crystalline solid |
| Density | 1.5 g/cm^{3} |
| Melting point | 89 °C (192 °F; 362 K) |
| Solubility in water | Soluble; 370 g/l at 20 °C (68 °F) |

Structure
| Crystal structure | Orthorhombic |

Hazards
- Occupational safety and health (OHS/OSH)
| Main hazards | May cause cancer, damage to the liver and kidneys |
- GHS labelling
| Pictograms | (GHS05: Corrosive) (GHS06: Toxic) (GHS07: Exclamation mark) (GHS08: Health hazard) (GHS09: Environmental hazard) |
| Signal word | Danger |
| Hazard statements | H301, H310, H310+H330, H311, H314, H317, H330, H331, H341, H350, H410 |
| Precautionary statements | P203, P260, P262, P264, P270, P271, P272, P273, P280, P284, P301+P316, P301+P330+P331, P302+P352, P302+P361+P354, P304+P340, P305+P354+P338, P316, P318, P320, P321, P330, P333+P317, P361+P364, P362+P364, P363, P391, P403+P233, P405, P501 |
- Lethal dose or concentration (LD, LC)
| LD_{50} (median dose) | 126 mg/kg (rat, intraperitoneal); 128 mg/kg (rat, oral); 118 mg/kg (rat, intravenous); 126 mg/kg (mouse, oral); 122 mg/kg (mouse, intravenous) |

Related compounds
| Other anions | Hydrazinium nitrate; Hydrazinium azide; Hydrazinium nitroformate; Hydrazinium hydrogensulfate |
| Other cations | Ammonium chloride; Hydroxylammonium chloride; Tetramethylammonium chloride; Sodium chloride |
| Related compounds | Hydrazine; Hydrogen chloride |
- Except where otherwise noted, data are given for materials in their standard state (at 25 °C [77 °F], 100 kPa). Infobox references

Hydrazinium chloride is an inorganic compound with the chemical formula [NH_{2}NH_{3}]Cl or [N_{2}H_{5}]Cl. It is a colorless hygroscopic crystalline solid. It is the hydrazine salt of hydrogen chloride. It consists of hydrazinium cations [H_{2}N−NH_{3}]^{+} and chloride anions Cl^{−}. It decomposes at 240 °C (464 °F), producing hydrogen chloride and nitrogen oxides.

== Synthesis ==
Hydrazinium chloride can be synthesized by the reaction of hydrazine and hydrogen chloride.

H_{2}N−NH_{2} + HCl → [H_{2}N−NH_{3}]^{+}Cl^{−}

== Structure ==
Hydrazinium chloride has an orthorhombic crystal structure (a = 1249 pm, b = 2185 pm, c = 441 pm) with the space group Fdd2. The crystal of hydrazinium chloride obtained from an alcoholic solution are very fine needles parallel to the c axis.

Hydrazinium chloride passes through several phase transitions at elevated pressures. The structure of phase I at room temperature and 1.8 GPa is confirmed to be space group C2/c. A structural transition from phase I to phase II is observed at 7.3 GPa. Pressure-induced position variation of hydrogen atoms in −NH^{+}_{3} units during the phase transition is attributed to the formation of N―H···Cl hydrogen bonds. Finally, a further transition from phase II to phase III accompanied with a slight distortion in the hydrazinium ions occurs above 19.8 GPa. Phase III exists up to at least 39.5 GPa.

== Uses ==
Hydrazinium chloride is commonly used as a reagent in the synthesis of pyrazoles. It is used as a catalyst in the synthesis of titanium oxide polymers via catalytic sol-gel process, and in preparation of amorphous titanium dioxide thin films with high refractive indices and high transparency.

Hydrazinium chloride is often used as a reducing agent in various chemical reactions and has uses in the preparation of other hydrazine derivatives. It is also used in the preparation of certain pharmaceuticals and as a reagent in analytical chemistry.

Hydrazinium chloride can be used to synthesize energetic materials containing hydrazinium cation.
