= Hydrazine nitrate =

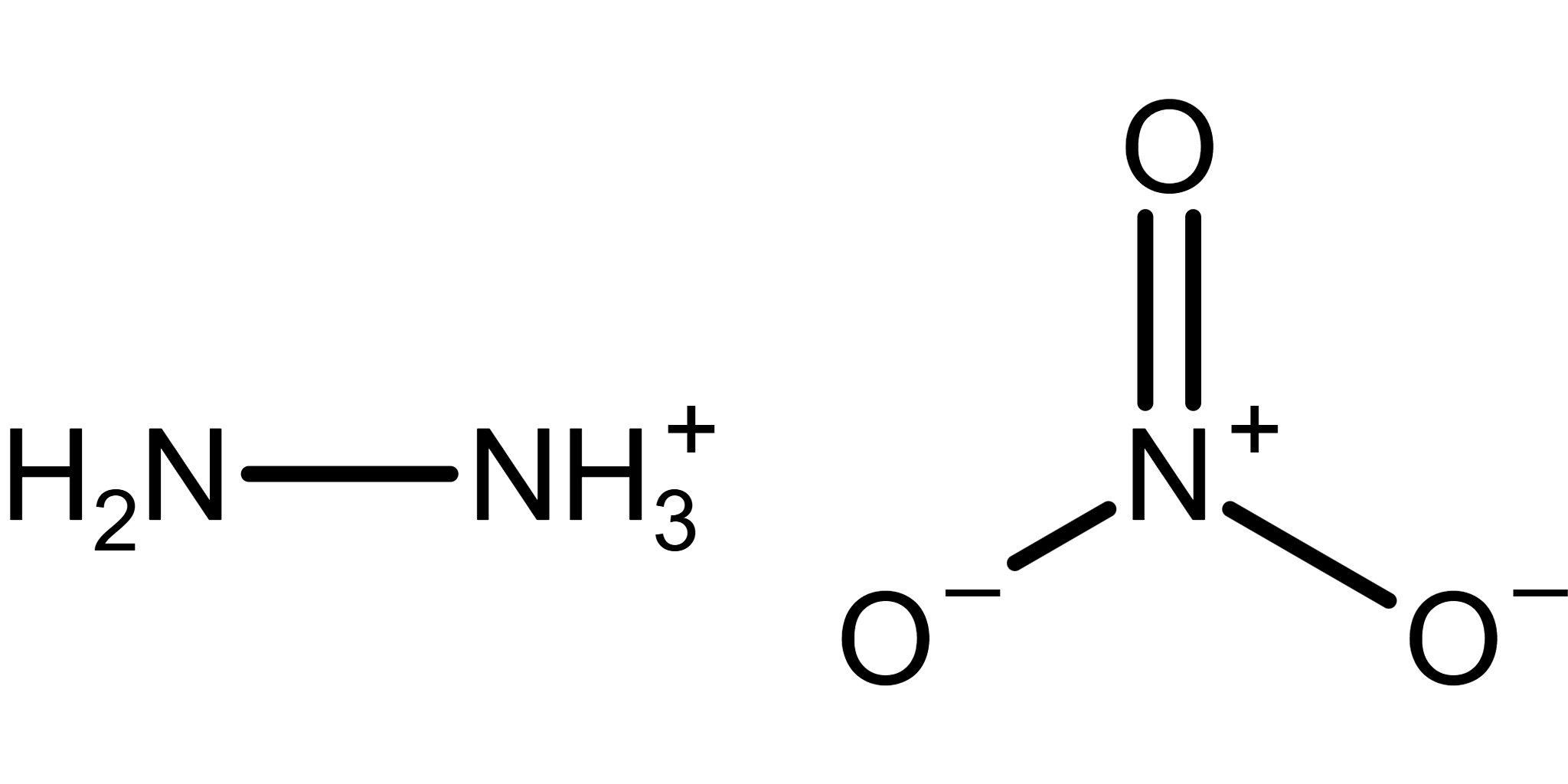

Names
- Other names Hydrazinium nitrate

Identifiers
CAS Number	13464-97-6
3D model (JSmol)	Interactive image
ChemSpider	11279085
ECHA InfoCard	100.033.341
PubChem CID	166817
UNII	B8357Z64IP
CompTox Dashboard (EPA)	DTXSID0065484
- InChI: InChI=1S/H4N2.NO3/c1-2;2-1(3)4/h1-2H2;/q;-1/p+1 Key: AFEBXVJYLNMAJB-UHFFFAOYSA-N
- SMILES: [O-][N+]([O-])=O.N[NH3+]

Properties
Chemical formula	[N_{2}H_{5}]NO_{3}
Molar mass	95.058 g·mol^{−1}
Appearance	Colorless crystalline solid
Density	1.64 g/cm^{3}
Melting point	72°C
Solubility in water	Soluble in water

Hazards
- GHS labelling
Pictograms	(GHS06: Toxic) (GHS08: Health hazard) (GHS09: Environmental hazard)
Signal word	Danger
Hazard statements	H301, H311, H317, H330, H331, H350, H410
Precautionary statements	P203, P260, P262, P264, P270, P271, P272, P273, P280, P284, P301+P316, P302+P352, P304+P340, P316, P318, P320, P321, P330, P333+P317, P361+P364, P362+P364, P391, P403+P233, P405, P501

Related compounds
Other anions	Hydrazinium chloride; Hydrazinium azide; Hydrazinium nitroformate; Hydrazinium hydrogensulfate
Other cations	Ammonium nitrate; Guanidinium nitrate
Related compounds	Hydrazine; Nitric acid
- Except where otherwise noted, data are given for materials in their standard state (at 25 °C [77 °F], 100 kPa). Infobox references

Hydrazine nitrate is an inorganic compound with the chemical formula [N_{2}H_{5}]NO_{3}. It is a colorless crystalline solid. It is the hydrazine salt of nitric acid. It consists of hydrazinium cations [H_{2}N−NH_{3}]^{+} and nitrate anions NO^{−}_{3}. It has usage in liquid explosives as an oxidizer. It exists in two crystalline forms, stable α-type and unstable β-type. The former is usually used in explosives. Its solubility is small in alcohols but large in water and hydrazine. It has strong hygroscopicity, only slightly lower than ammonium nitrate.

Hydrazine nitrate has a good thermal stability. Its weight loss rate at 100 °C is slower than that of ammonium nitrate. Its explosion point is 307 °C (50% detonation) and explosion heat is about 3.829 MJ/kg. Because it has no carbon elements, the detonation products are not solid and their average molecular weight is small.

== Production ==
Hydrazine nitrate is produced by the reaction of hydrazine and nitric acid:

N_{2}H_{4} + HNO_{3} → [N_{2}H_{5}]NO_{3}
