= C3H7N =

The molecular formula C_{3}H_{7}N may refer to:

- Acetone imine
- Allylamine (2-propen-1-amine)
- Aminocyclopropane
- Azetidine (trimethylenimine)
- Cyclopropylamine
- 2-Methylaziridine
- N-Methylaziridine
