= Azine =

Chemical compound

The generic formula of an azine. For an aldazine, R^{2}, R^{4} = H.

Azines are a functional class of organic compounds with the connectivity RR′C=N−N=CRR′. These compounds are the product of the condensation of hydrazine with ketones and aldehydes, although in practice they are often made by alternative routes. Ketazines are azines derived from ketones. For example, acetone azine is the simplest ketazine. Aldazines are azines derived from aldehydes.

== Preparation ==
The usual method of industrial production is the peroxide process, starting from the ketone, ammonia, and hydrogen peroxide.

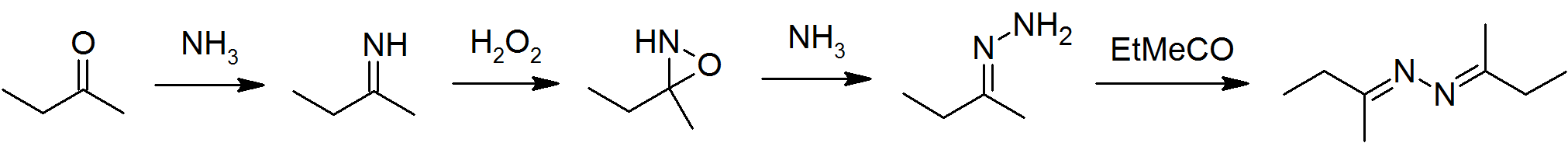

In the laboratory, azines are typically prepared by condensation of hydrazine with two equivalents of a carbonyl.

== Reactions ==
Azines characteristically undergo hydrolysis to hydrazines. The reaction proceeds by the intermediacy of a hydrazone:

R_{2}C=N−N=CR_{2} + H_{2}O → R_{2}C=N−NH_{2} + R_{2}C=O
R_{2}C=N−NH_{2} + H_{2}O → N_{2}H_{4} + R_{2}C=O

Azines have been used as precursors to hydrazones:

R_{2}C=N−N=CR_{2} + N_{2}H_{4} → 2R_{2}C=N−NH_{2}

They are also precursors to diazo compounds.

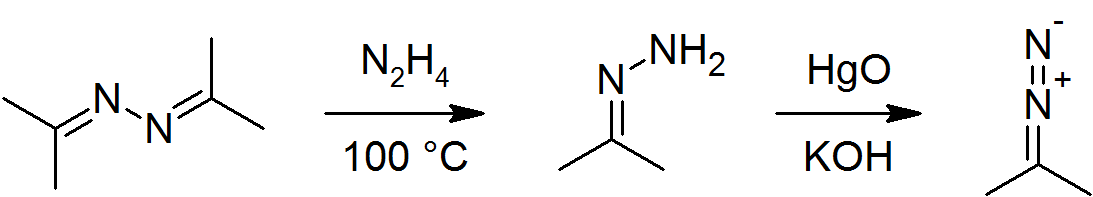

The coordination chemistry of azines (as ligands) has also been studied.

Acetone is used to derivatize hydrazine into acetone azine for analysis by gas chromatography. This method is used to determine trace levels of hydrazine in drinking water and pharmaceuticals.

== Applications ==
Ketazines are also important intermediates in the industrial production of hydrazine hydrate by the peroxide process. In the presence of an oxidant, ammonia and ketones react to give hydrazine via ketazine:

2 Me(Et)C=O + 2 NH_{3} + H_{2}O_{2} → Me(Et)C=NN=C(Et)Me + 2 H_{2}O

The ketazine can be hydrolyzed to the hydrazine and regenerate the ketone:

Me(Et)C=NN=C(Et)Me + 2 H_{2}O → 2 Me(Et)C=O + N_{2}H_{4}

Ketazines have been also used as sources of hydrazine produced in situ, for example in the production of herbicide precursor 1,2,4-triazole.
