= HNF =

HNF may refer to:

- Hanford (Amtrak station), in California, United States
- Head normal form
- Hednesford railway station, in England
- Heinz Nixdorf MuseumsForum, in Paderborn, Germany
- Hepatocyte nuclear factor
- Hermite normal form
- Hesse normal form
- Hoosier National Forest, in Indiana, United States
- Hydrazinium nitroformate
