= C6H12N2 =

The molecular formula C_{6}H_{12}N_{2} (molar mass: 112.17 g/mol, exact mass: 112.1000 u) may refer to:

- Acetone azine
- DABCO, or 1,4-diazabicyclo[2.2.2]octane
