= C2H3N3 =

The molecular formula C_{2}H_{3}N_{3} may refer to:

- Triazole
  - 1,2,3-Triazole
  - 1,2,4-Triazole
- Vinyl azide
