= C3H8N2 =

The molecular formula C_{3}H_{8}N_{2} (molar mass: 72.11 g/mol, exact mass: 72.0688 u) may refer to:

- Acetone hydrazone
- Imidazolidine
- Pyrazolidine
