= Acetone azine =

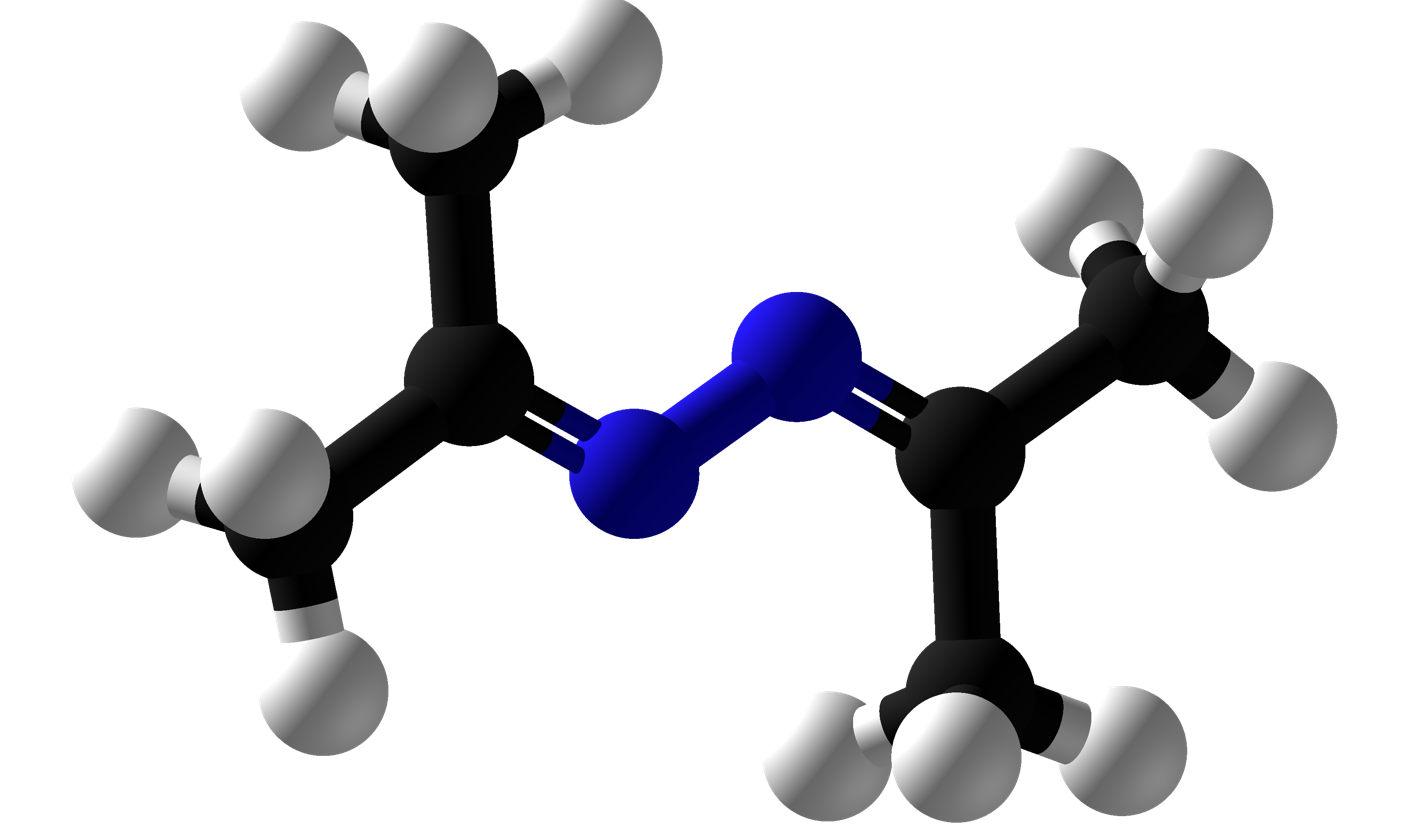

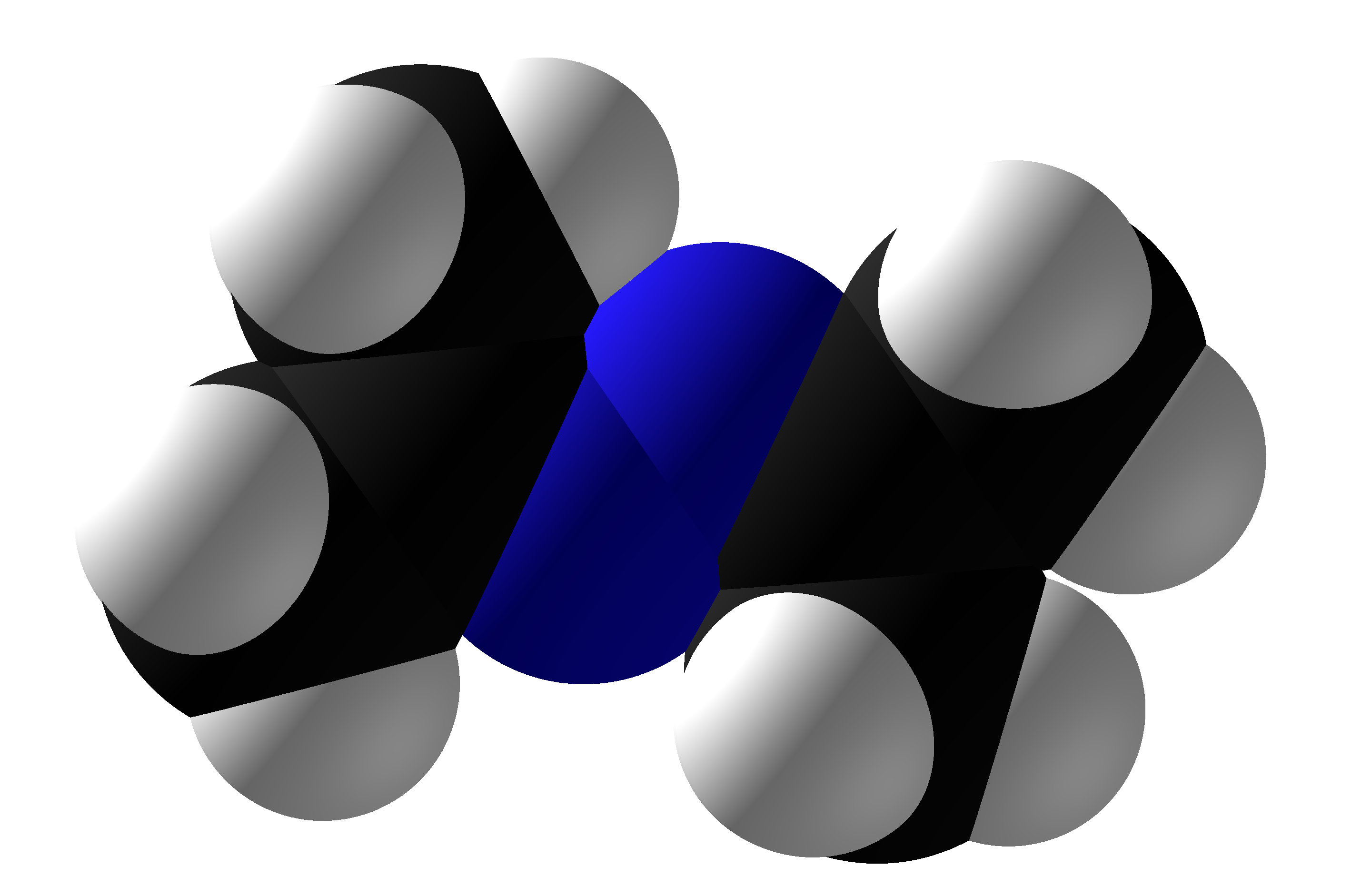

Names
- Preferred IUPAC name 1,2-Di(propan-2-ylidene)hydrazine
- Systematic IUPAC name Acetone azine
- Other names: Ketazine; Acetone ketazine; Dimethyl ketazine; 2-Propanone, 2-(1-methylethylidene)hydrazone; Acetone isopropylidenehydrazone; Dipropan-2-ylidenehydrazine; Diisopropylidene hydrazine; N-(propan-2-ylideneamino)propan-2-imine

Identifiers
CAS Number	627-70-3
3D model (JSmol)	Interactive image
Beilstein Reference	4-01-00-03207
ChemSpider	71417
ECHA InfoCard	100.010.009
EC Number	211-009-6
PubChem CID	79085
UNII	Q18Y7G3ZPB
CompTox Dashboard (EPA)	DTXSID1060845
- InChI: InChI=1S/C6H12N2/c1-5(2)7-8-6(3)4/h1-4H3 Key: PFLUPZGCTVGDLV-UHFFFAOYSA-N
- SMILES: N(\N=C(/C)C)=C(\C)C

Properties
Chemical formula	C_{6}H_{12}N_{2}
Molar mass	112.176 g·mol^{−1}
Appearance	Pale-yellow liquid
Density	0.842 g cm^{−3}
Melting point	−125 °C (−193 °F; 148 K)
Boiling point	133 °C (271 °F; 406 K)
Refractive index (n_{D})	1.454

Hazards
- GHS labelling
Pictograms	(GHS02: Flammable) (GHS08: Health hazard) (GHS06: Toxic)
Signal word	Danger
Hazard statements	H226, H302, H311, H315, H319, H335, H350
Precautionary statements	P201, P261, P280, P305+P351+P338, P308+P313
NFPA 704 (fire diamond)	3 2 0
Flash point	31 °C (88 °F; 304 K)

Related compounds
Related compounds	Hydrazine Acetone
- Except where otherwise noted, data are given for materials in their standard state (at 25 °C [77 °F], 100 kPa). Infobox references

Acetone azine is the simplest ketazine. It is an intermediate in some hydrazine manufacturing processes.

== Synthesis ==
Acetone azine can be prepared from acetone and hydrazine:

2 (CH_{3})_{2}CO + N_{2}H_{4} → 2 H_{2}O + [(CH_{3})_{2}C=N]_{2}

It can also be produced from acetone (2 eq.), ammonia (2 eq.) and hydrogen peroxide (1 eq.). The first step is the formation of acetone imine, Me_{2}C=NH; this is then oxidized by hydrogen peroxide through a complex mechanism to give 3,3-dimethyloxaziridine, which reacts with a further molecule of ammonia to produce acetone hydrazone. The hydrazone then condenses with a further molecule of acetone to produce the azine. The acetone azine product is distilled out of the reaction mixture as a 1:6 azeotrope with water.

== Reactions ==
Acetone azine can be used to prepare acetone hydrazone and 2-diazopropane.

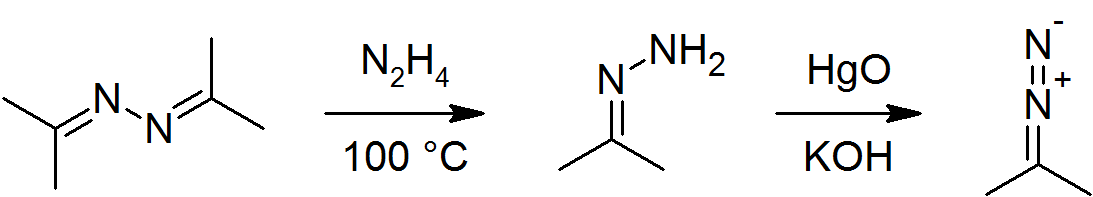

Hydrazine can be produced through acid-catalysed hydrolysis of acetone azine:

2 H_{2}O + [(CH_{3})_{2}C=N]_{2} → 2 (CH_{3})_{2}CO + N_{2}H_{4}
