= Pellizzari reaction =

Chemical reaction

The Pellizzari reaction was discovered in 1911 by Guido Pellizzari, and is the organic reaction of an amide and a hydrazide to form a 1,2,4-triazole.

The product is similar to that of the Einhorn-Brunner reaction, but the mechanism itself is not regioselective.

An overview of the Pellizzari reaction

== Mechanism ==
The mechanism begins by the nitrogen in the hydrazide attacking the carbonyl carbon on the amide to form compound 3. The negatively charged oxygen then abstracts two hydrogens from neighboring nitrogens in order for a molecule of water to be released to form compound 5. The nitrogen then performs an intramolecular attack on the carbonyl group to form the five-membered ring of compound 6. After another proton migration from the nitrogens to the oxygen, another water molecule is released to form the 1,2,4-triazole 8.

Pellizzari reaction mechanism

== Uses ==
The synthesis of the 1,2,4-triazole has a wide range of biological functions. 1,2,4-triazoles have antibacterial, antifungal, antidepressant and hypoglycemic properties. 3-benzylsulfanyl derivates of the triazole also show slight to moderate antimycobacterial activity, but are considered moderately toxic.

== Problems and variations ==
The Pellizzari reaction is limited in the number of substituents that can be on the ring, so other methods have been developed to incorporate three elements of diversity. Liquid-phase synthesis of 3-alkylamino-4,5-disubstituted-1,2,4-triazoles by PEG support has given moderate yields with excellent purity. In practice, the Pellizzari reaction requires high temperatures, long reaction times, and has an overall low yield. However, adding microwave irradiation shortens the reaction time and increases its yield.

== Related reactions ==
- Einhorn-Brunner reaction
