= Peroxide process =

Method for production of hydrazine

The peroxide process is a method for the industrial production of hydrazine.

In this process hydrogen peroxide is used as an oxidant instead of sodium hypochlorite, which is traditionally used to generate hydrazine. The main advantage of the peroxide process to hydrazine relative to the traditional Olin Raschig process is that it does not coproduce salt. In this respect, the peroxide process is an example of green chemistry. Since many millions of kilograms of hydrazine are produced annually, this method is of both commercial and environmental significance.

== Production ==
=== Ketazine formation ===
In the usual implementation, hydrogen peroxide is used together with acetamide. This mixture does not react with ammonia directly but does so in the presence of methyl ethyl ketone to give the oxaziridine.

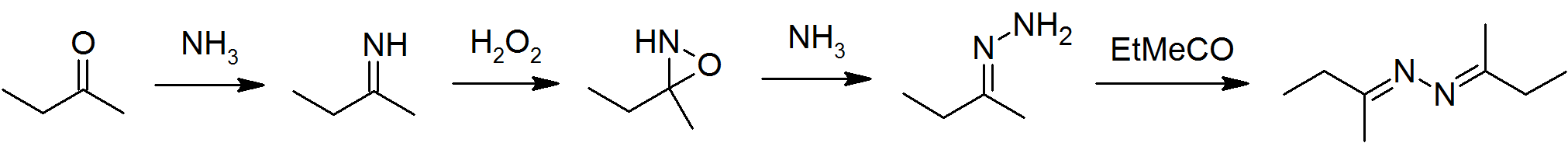

Balanced equations for the individual steps are as follows. Imine formation through condensation:

Me(Et)C=O + NH_{3} → Me(Et)C=NH + H_{2}O

Oxidation of the imine to the oxaziridine:

Me(Et)C=NH + H_{2}O_{2} → Me(Et)CONH + H_{2}O

Condensation of the oxaziridine with a second molecule of ammonia to give the hydrazone:

Me(Et)CONH + NH_{3} → Me(Et)C=NNH_{2} + H_{2}O

The hydrazone then condenses with a second equivalent of ketone to give the ketazine:

Me(Et)C=O + Me(Et)C=NNH_{2} → Me(Et)C=NN=C(Et)Me + H_{2}O

Typical process conditions are 50 °C and atmospheric pressure, with a feed mix of H_{2}O_{2}:ketone:NH_{3} in a molar ratio of about 1:2:4. Methyl ethyl ketone is advantageous to acetone because the resulting ketazine is immiscible in the reaction mixture and can be separated by decantation. A similar process based on benzophenone has also been described.

=== Ketazine to hydrazine ===
The final stage involves hydrolysis of the purified ketazine:

Me(Et)C=NN=C(Et)Me + 2 H_{2}O → 2 Me(Et)C=O + N_{2}H_{4}

The hydrolysis of the azine is acid-catalyzed, hence the need to isolate the azine from the initial ammonia-containing reaction mixture. It is also endothermic, and so requires an increase in temperature (and pressure) to shift the equilibrium in favour of the desired products: ketone (which is recycled) and hydrazine hydrate. The reaction is carried out by simple distillation of the azeotrope: typical conditions are a pressure of 8 bar and temperatures of 130 °C at the top of the column and 179 °C at the bottom of the column. The hydrazine hydrate (30–45% aqueous solution) is run off from the base of the column, while the methyl ethyl ketone is distilled off from the top of the column and recycled.

== History ==
The peroxide process, also called the Pechiney–Ugine–Kuhlmann process, was developed in the early 1970s by Produits Chimiques Ugine Kuhlmann. Originally the process used acetone instead of methyl ethyl ketone. Methyl ethyl ketone is advantageous because the resulting ketazine is immiscible in the reaction mixture and can be separated by decantation. The world's largest hydrazine hydrate plant is in Lannemezan in France, producing 17,000 tonnes of hydrazine products per year.

=== Bayer ketazine process ===
Before invention of the peroxide process, the Bayer ketazine process had been commercialized. In the Bayer process, the oxidation of ammonia by sodium hypochlorite is conducted in the presence of acetone. The process generates the ketazine but also sodium chloride:

2 Me_{2}CO + 2 NH_{3} + NaOCl → Me_{2}C=NN=CMe_{2} + 3 H_{2}O + NaCl
Me_{2}C=NN=CMe_{2} + 2 H_{2}O → N_{2}H_{4} + 2 Me_{2}CO
