= Sodium hydrazide =

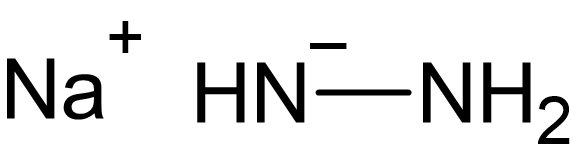

Names
- Systematic IUPAC name Sodium aminoazanide
- Other names: Sodium diazanide

Identifiers
CAS Number	13598-47-5
3D model (JSmol)	Interactive image
ChemSpider	9963794
PubChem CID	11789120
- InChI: InChI=1S/H3N2.Na/c1-2;/h1H,2H2;/q-1;+1
- SMILES: N[NH-].[Na+]

Properties
Chemical formula	NaN_{2}H_{3}
Molar mass	54.03 g/mol
Appearance	Pale-yellow solid
Melting point	100 °C (212 °F; 373 K) (decomposes)
Solubility in water	Detonates on contact
Solubility	Detonates on contact with alcohols, insoluble in benzene, diethyl ether, soluble in anhydrous hydrazine and ammonia

Hazards
- GHS labelling
Pictograms	(GHS01: Explosive)
- Except where otherwise noted, data are given for materials in their standard state (at 25 °C [77 °F], 100 kPa). Infobox references

Sodium hydrazide is an inorganic compound with the formula NaN_{2}H_{3}. It is a pale yellow solid that detonates when in contact with air, water, or alcohol.

== History and preparation ==
Sodium hydrazide was first observed as a mixture with sodium hydroxide in 1895 when excess sodium metal was added to hydrazine hydrate under nitrogen. Subsequently, sodium hydrazide was isolated in pure form by Wilhelm Schlenk in 1915 by the reaction of sodium metal and anhydrous hydrazine, followed by removal of the excess hydrazine by heating to 60 °C:

2Na + 2N_{2}H_{4} → 2NaN_{2}H_{3} + H_{2}

It can also be produced by the reaction of sodium amide or sodium hydride and hydrazine.

== Properties ==
Sodium hydrazide is a pale-yellow solid that detonates when heated above 100 °C. It also detonates when in contact with air, water, or alcohol, such as ethanol. Due to this, it is used as a suspension in benzene or diethyl ether in organic reactions. It is capable of doing nucleophilic additions to various compounds, such as nitriles, which are converted to amidrazones.
