= Einhorn–Brunner reaction =

Chemical reaction of imides with alkyl hydrazines

The Einhorn–Brunner reaction is the designation for the chemical reaction of imides with alkyl hydrazines to form an isomeric mixture of 1,2,4-triazoles. It was initially described by the German chemist Alfred Einhorn in a paper, published in 1905, describing N-methylol compounds of amides. In 1914 chemist Karl Brunner published a paper expanding on Einhorn's research of the reaction pictured below, thus resulting in the naming as the Einhorn-Brunner. Substituted 1,2,4-triazole have been prepared from diverse imides and hydrazines.

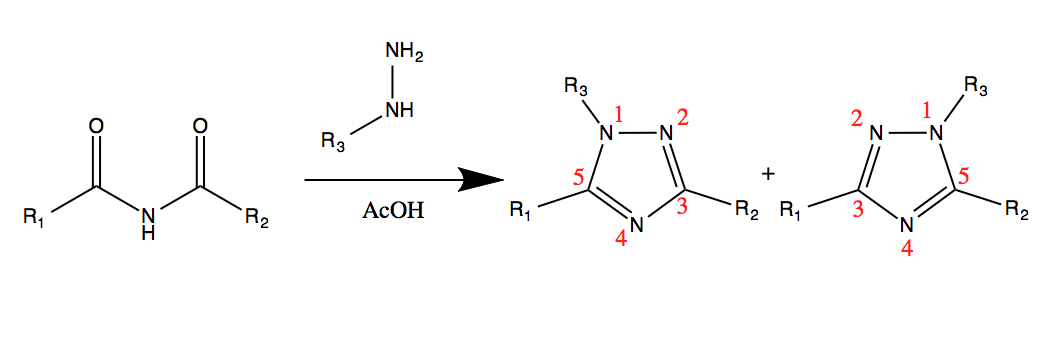
The Einhorn-Brunner Reaction

== Regioselectivity ==
In the case that the R groups of the imide are different, the reaction has regioselectivity. In their research on the synthesis of 1,2,4-triazoles, Potts determined that the strongest acidic group attached to the side of the imide will be favored for the 3 position on the triazole ring. In the diagram below, if one considers the blue R group to be more acidic in respect to the green, the favored product would be the isomer on the right.

== Mechanism ==
For clarity in depicting the electron flow of the mechanism, the image below only consists of one of the isomers generated in an Einhorn–Brunner reaction:

The first step of the mechanism involves the protonating of the substituted nitrogen of the hydrazine 1, generating the cation 2. Protonated hydrazine 2 protonates the oxygen of one of the carbonyl groups of the imide. This allows for an attack on the electrophilic carbon of the protonated carbonyl group by the primary amino group of the hydrazine, producing 3. The loss of water and subsequent generation of a double bond between the recently formed nitrogen-carbon sigma bond results in the formation of iminiumion 4. 4 undergoes a 1,5-proton shift from the nitrogen to the carbonyl oxygen, seen in 5. Intramolecular attack of the electrophilic carbonyl carbon by the nitrogen, resulting in a 5-membered ring closure of the positively charged 6. Elimination of a water group, and then a proton results in the intermediates of 7 and 8 respectively, and finally results in the formation of 9, one 1,2,4-triazole isomer.

== Applications ==
Triazoles have been found to have a number of real world applications as antibacterial agents. The Einhorn–Brunner reaction maintains scientific importance and relevance in the production of 1,2,4-triazoles, which can be further substituted for their medicinal value. Research done by Pattan et al., specifically on 1,2,4-triazoles, found antibacterial, antifungal, antitubercular, and anti-inflammatory activity of variously substituted compounds. Klimešová and colleagues also report antimycobacterial activity of 1,2,4-triazoles against tuberculosis, but also risk a low level of toxicity.

== Related reactions ==
- Pellizzari reaction
