= Acetone hydrazone =

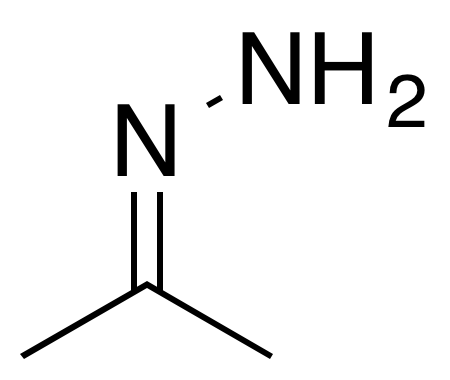

Names
- IUPAC name Propan-2-ylidenehydrazine
- Other names Isopropylidenehydrazine

Identifiers
| CAS Number | 5281-20-9 |
| 3D model (JSmol) | Interactive image |
| ChemSpider | 71270 |
| EC Number | 226-110-0 |
| PubChem CID | 78937 |
| CompTox Dashboard (EPA) | DTXSID10967276 |
- InChI: InChI=1S/C3H8N2/c1-3(2)5-4/h4H2,1-2H3 Key: JIQXKYSNGXUDJU-UHFFFAOYSA-N
- SMILES: CC(=NN)C

Properties
| Chemical formula | C_{3}H_{8}N_{2} |
| Molar mass | 72.111 g·mol^{−1} |

Hazards
- GHS labelling
| Pictograms | (GHS02: Flammable) (GHS05: Corrosive) (GHS06: Toxic) (GHS08: Health hazard) (GHS09: Environmental hazard) |
| Signal word | Danger |
| Hazard statements | H226, H301, H311, H314, H331, H351, H411 |
| Precautionary statements | P203, P210, P233, P240, P241, P242, P243, P260, P264, P270, P271, P273, P280, P301+P316, P301+P330+P331, P302+P352, P302+P361+P354, P303+P361+P353, P304+P340, P305+P354+P338, P316, P318, P321, P330, P361+P364, P363, P370+P378, P391, P403+P233, P403+P235, P405, P501 |
- Except where otherwise noted, data are given for materials in their standard state (at 25 °C [77 °F], 100 kPa). Infobox references

Acetone hydrazone (isopropylidenehydrazine) is the product of condensation of acetone and hydrazine, as typical for hydrazone formation. It is an intermediate in the synthesis of 2-diazopropane.

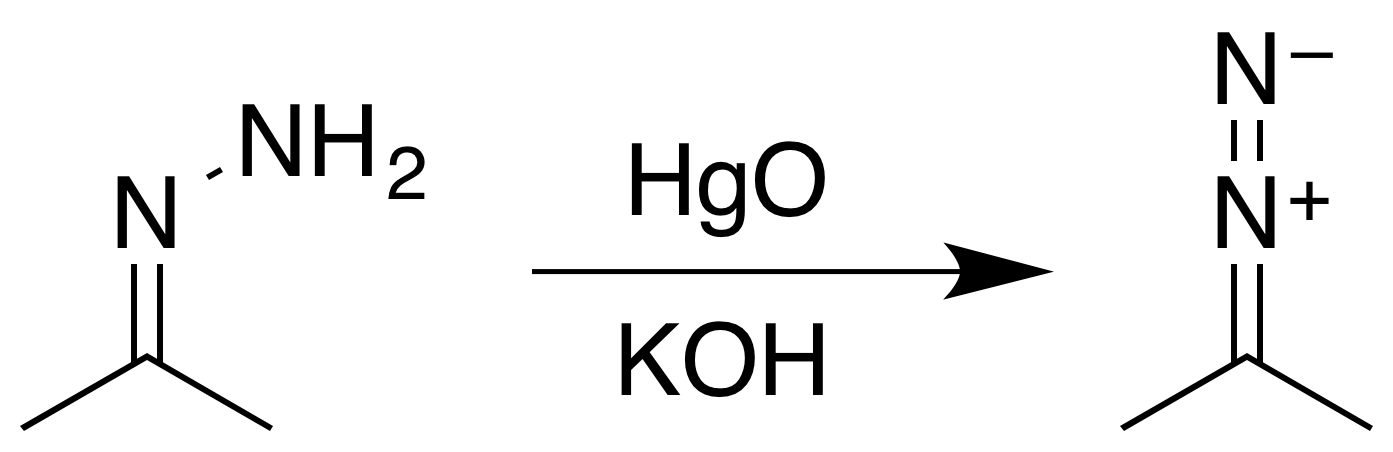

Acetone hydrazone can be produced on large scale by reaction of acetone azine with hydrazine, a more convenient reaction than direct reaction of acetone and hydrazine. Likewise, it is susceptible to disproportionation to revert to acetone azine and hydrazine, especially in the presence of water.

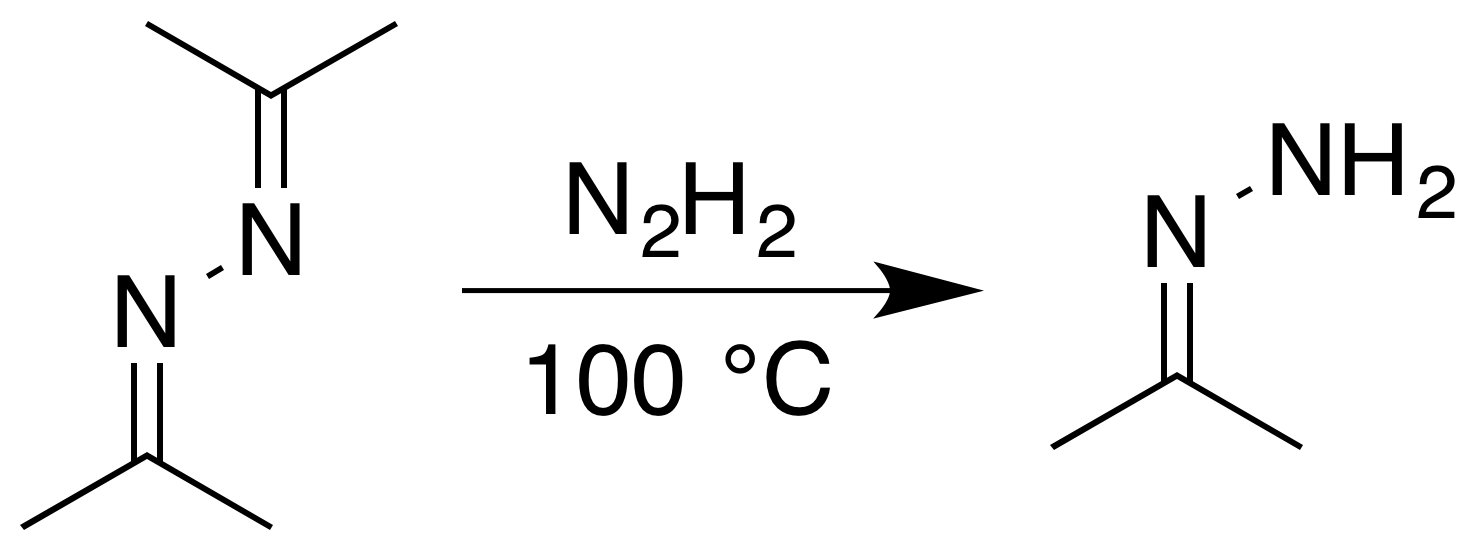

The chemical is one of the metabolic products of the antihypertensive pharmaceutical hydralazine, and itself also have antihypertensive effects.
