= Propyleneimine =

Names
- IUPAC name 2-Methylaziridine
- Other names 1,2-Propylenimine

Identifiers
CAS Number	75-55-8
3D model (JSmol)	Interactive image
ChemSpider	6137
ECHA InfoCard	100.000.799
EC Number	613-033-00-6
KEGG	C19496
PubChem CID	6377
RTECS number	CM8050000
UNII	ULC972Q7TZ
UN number	1921 (inhibited)
CompTox Dashboard (EPA)	DTXSID8024286
- InChI: InChI=1S/C3H7N/c1-3-2-4-3/h3-4H,2H2,1H3 Key: OZDGMOYKSFPLSE-UHFFFAOYSA-N; InChI=1/C3H7N/c1-3-2-4-3/h3-4H,2H2,1H3 Key: OZDGMOYKSFPLSE-UHFFFAOYAW
- SMILES: N1C(C)C1

Properties
Chemical formula	C_{3}H_{7}N
Molar mass	57.096 g·mol^{−1}
Appearance	Colorless, oily liquid
Odor	ammonia-like
Density	0.9 g/mL
Melting point	−63 °C (−81 °F; 210 K)
Boiling point	67 °C (153 °F; 340 K)
Solubility in water	Miscible
Vapor pressure	112 mmHg (20°C)

Hazards
- GHS labelling
Pictograms	(GHS02: Flammable) (GHS05: Corrosive) (GHS06: Toxic) (GHS08: Health hazard) (GHS09: Environmental hazard)
Signal word	Danger
Hazard statements	H225, H300, H310, H318, H330, H350, H411
Precautionary statements	P201, P202, P210, P233, P240, P241, P242, P243, P260, P262, P264, P270, P271, P273, P280, P281, P284, P301+P310, P302+P350, P303+P361+P353, P304+P340, P305+P351+P338, P308+P313, P310, P320, P321, P330, P361, P363, P370+P378, P391, P403+P233, P403+P235, P405, P501
Flash point	−4 °C (25 °F; 269 K)
- Lethal dose or concentration (LD, LC)
LC_{Lo} (lowest published)	500 ppm (rat, 4 hr)
- NIOSH (US health exposure limits)
PEL (Permissible)	TWA 2 ppm (5 mg/m^{3}) [skin]
REL (Recommended)	Ca TWA 2 ppm (5 mg/m^{3}) [skin]
IDLH (Immediate danger)	Ca [100 ppm]
- Except where otherwise noted, data are given for materials in their standard state (at 25 °C [77 °F], 100 kPa). Infobox references

Propyleneimine (or propylene imine) is the organic compound with the formula CH_{3}CH(NH)CH_{2}. It is a secondary amine and the smallest chiral aziridine (ring containing C_{2}N). It is a flammable colorless liquid. Its derivatives, copolymers and oligomers, are of commercial interest.

== Uses ==
This chemical is used in the paper, textile, rubber and pharmaceutical industries. Propyleneimine is also used in making paint.

The top global producers of this specialty chemical include DuPont, Mitsubishi Chemical Holdings Corporation, Sigma-Aldrich, Dixie Chemical Company, J and K Scientific, Apollo Scientific, Mitsui Chemicals.

The compound is also of interest for the synthesis of dendrimers, a process that exploits the tendency of aziridines to undergo ring-opening reactions.

== Health Effects ==
NIOSH considers propyleneimine a potential occupational carcinogen.

According to a report prepared for the United Church of Christ, propyleneimine emissions from the Dixie Chemical Company facility in Bayport, Pasadena, Texas, are one of the top ten toxicity-weighted air pollutions in the United States.
