= Hydrazinium azide =

Names
- IUPAC name Hydrazinium azide

Identifiers
CAS Number	14662-04-5
3D model (JSmol)	Interactive image
PubChem CID	18385035
CompTox Dashboard (EPA)	DTXSID201095321
- InChI: InChI=1S/N3.H4N2/c1-3-2;1-2/h;1-2H2/q-1;/p+1 Key: UZXHZRFWCCZBDW-UHFFFAOYSA-O
- SMILES: N[NH3+].[N-]=[N+]=[N-]

Properties
Chemical formula	H_{5}N_{5}
Molar mass	75.075 g·mol^{−1}
Appearance	White solid
Melting point	75.4 °C (167.7 °F; 348.5 K)
Solubility in water	Very soluble
Solubility in Methanol	6.1 g/100g (23 °C (73 °F; 296 K))
Solubility in Hydrazine	190 g/100g (23 °C (73 °F; 296 K))
Solubility in Ethanol	1.2 g/100g (23 °C (73 °F; 296 K))
- Except where otherwise noted, data are given for materials in their standard state (at 25 °C [77 °F], 100 kPa). Infobox references

Hydrazinium azide or hydrazine azide is a chemical compound with formula H_{5}N_{5} or [N_{2}H_{5}][N_{3}]. It is an unstable white solid. It consists of hydrazinium cations [N_{2}H_{5}]^{+} and azide anions [N_{3}]^{−}. It is the hydrazine salt of hydrazoic acid.

When very pure, it is insensitive to ordinary levels of shock or impact and only decomposes slowly when heated, but less pure forms tend to explode when heated to a bit over 100 °C (212 °F) or when heated too rapidly.

== Structure ==
The solid undergoes structural phase transition to a different crystalline arrangement at a pressure of 13 GPa (130,000 atm).

== Preparation ==
Hydrazinium azide was first prepared by neutralizing hydrazoic acid with hydrazine hydrate.

== Chemistry ==
Hydrazinium azide decomposes explosively into hydrazine, ammonia, and nitrogen gas:

12 N_{5}H_{5} → 3 N_{2}H_{4} + 16 NH_{3} + 19 N_{2}

Crystallization with an equimolar amount hydrazine yields the solid hydrazinium azide hydrazinate, [N_{2}H^{+}_{5}][N^{−}_{3}]·[N_{2}H_{4}], or N_{7}H_{9}, as monoclinic crystals. This compound is less hygroscopic and less volatile than pure hydrazinium azide. It decomposes explosively into nitrogen, hydrogen, and ammonia.

At pressure of 40 GPa (390,000 atm), hydrazinium azide decomposes yielding a linear nitrogen allotrope N_{8} or N≡N^{+}−N^{−}−N=N−^{−}N−^{+}N≡N, that decomposes to ε−N_{2} below 25 GPa (250,000 atm).

Reaction of hydrazinium azide with sulfuric acid gives quantitative yields of pure hydrazinediium sulfate and hydrazoic acid:

[N_{2}H^{+}_{5}][N^{−}_{3}] + H_{2}SO_{4} → [N_{2}H^{2+}_{6}][SO^{2−}_{4}] + HN_{3}

== See also ==
- Ammonium azide, [NH^{+}_{4}][N^{−}_{3}]
