= 1,2,4-Triazole =

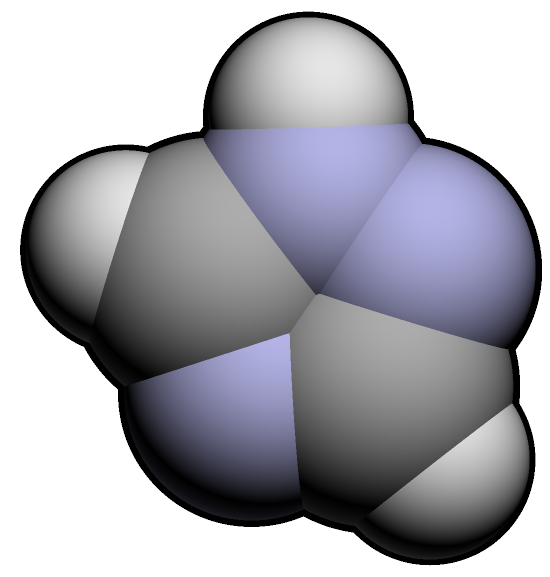

Names
- Preferred IUPAC name 1H-1,2,4-Triazole
- Other names 1,2,4-Triazole pyrrodiazole

Identifiers
| CAS Number | 288-88-0 |
| 3D model (JSmol) | Interactive image |
| ChEBI | CHEBI:46077 |
| ChEMBL | ChEMBL15571 |
| ChemSpider | 8900 |
| ECHA InfoCard | 100.005.476 |
| PubChem CID | 9257 |
| UNII | 10MS0Y1RDI |
| CompTox Dashboard (EPA) | DTXSID6027131 |
- InChI: InChI=1S/C2H3N3/c1-3-2-5-4-1/h1-2H,(H,3,4,5) Key: NSPMIYGKQJPBQR-UHFFFAOYSA-N; InChI=1/C2H3N3/c1-3-2-5-4-1/h1-2H,(H,3,4,5) Key: NSPMIYGKQJPBQR-UHFFFAOYAZ
- SMILES: N1C=NC=N1

Properties
| Chemical formula | C_{2}H_{3}N_{3} |
| Molar mass | 69.00725 |
| Appearance | white solid |
| Density | 1.439 g/cm^{3} |
| Melting point | 120 to 121 °C (248 to 250 °F; 393 to 394 K) |
| Boiling point | 260 °C (500 °F; 533 K) |
| Solubility in water | very soluble |
| Acidity (pK_{a}) | 10,3 |
| Basicity (pK_{b}) | 11,8 |

Hazards
| Flash point | 140 °C (284 °F; 413 K) |

Related compounds
| Related compounds | 1,2,3-triazole imidazole |
- Except where otherwise noted, data are given for materials in their standard state (at 25 °C [77 °F], 100 kPa). verify (what is ?) Infobox references

1,2,4-Triazole (as ligand in coordination compounds, Htrz abbreviation is sometimes used) is one of a pair of isomeric chemical compounds with molecular formula C_{2}H_{3}N_{3}, called triazoles, which have a five-membered ring of two carbon atoms and three nitrogen atoms. 1,2,4-Triazole and its derivatives find use in a wide variety of applications.

== Structure and properties ==
1,2,4-Triazole is a planar molecule. The C-N and N-N distances fall into a narrow range 136 - 132 picometers, consistent with the aromaticity. Although two tautomers can be envisioned, only one exists practically speaking.

1,2,4-Triazole is amphoteric, being susceptible to both N-protonation and deprotonation in aqueous solution. The pK_{a} of 1,2,4-triazolium (C_{2}N_{3}H_{4}^{+}) is 2.45. The pK_{a} of the neutral molecule is 10.26.

== Synthesis and occurrence ==
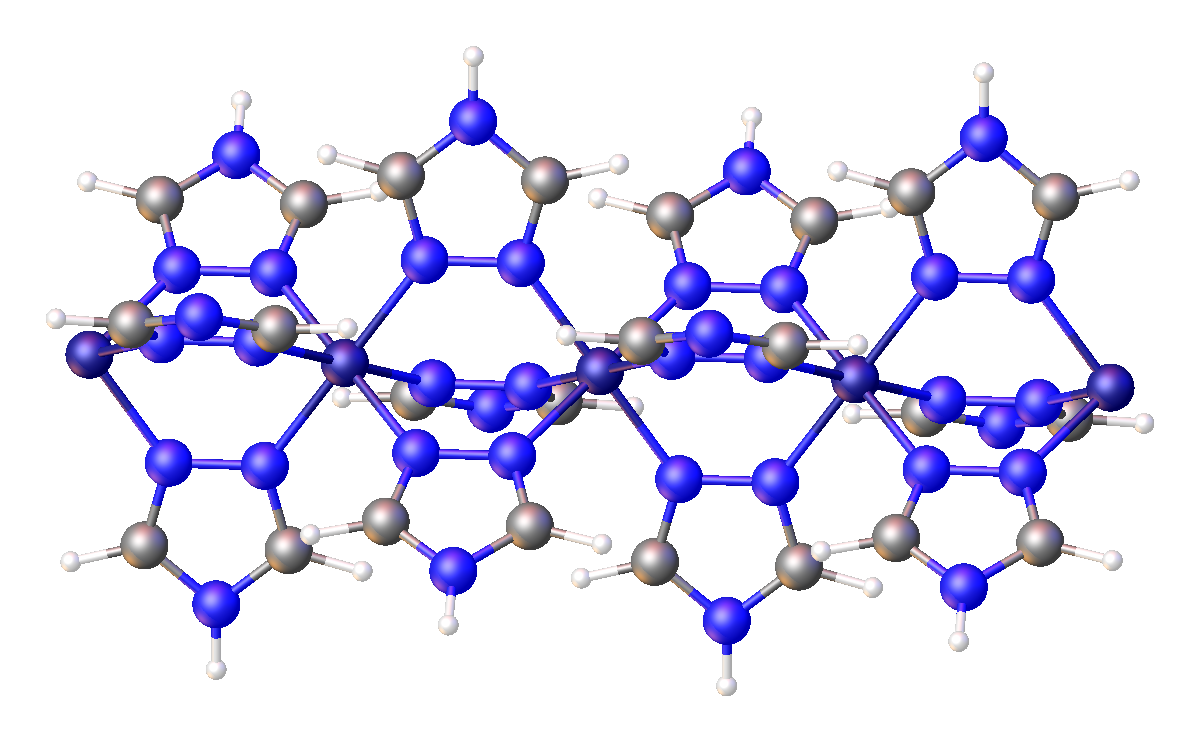
Portion of the structure of {[Fe(triazolate)(triazole)_{2}](BF_{4})}_{n}.

1,2,4-Triazoles can be prepared using the Einhorn–Brunner reaction or the Pellizzari reaction. In 2018, it was reported that reaction of isonitriles with diazonium salts produced 2,3-disubstituted or 2,5-disubstituted 1,2,4-triazoles depending on the catalyst. Unsubstituted 1,2,4-triazole can be prepared from thiosemicarbazide by acylation with formic acid followed by cyclization of 1-formyl-3-thiosemicarbazide into 1,2,4-triazole-3(5)-thiol; oxidation of the thiol by nitric acid or hydrogen peroxide yields 1,2,4-triazole.

1,2,4-Triazoles are featured in many kinds of drugs. Notable triazoles include the antifungal drugs fluconazole and itraconazole and the plant growth regulator paclobutrazol. Triazolate is a common bridging ligand in coordination chemistry.

The 3,5‑dihydroxy derivative, known as urazole, sees extensive industrial use as a blowing agent.
