= Hydrazinium =

Cation

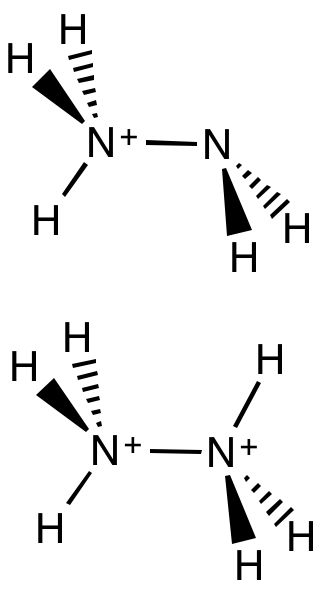
- Structures of hydrazinium [N_{2}H_{5}]^{+} and hydrazinediium [N_{2}H_{6}]^{2+}.

Names
- Other names Ammonia(+1) Dimer,

Identifiers
CAS Number	18500-32-8
3D model (JSmol)	Interactive image
ChEBI	CHEBI:35324
ChemSpider	79101
Gmelin Reference	183
PubChem CID	87681
CompTox Dashboard (EPA)	DTXSID10171699
- InChI: InChI=1S/H4N2/c1-2/h1-2H2/p+1 Key: OAKJQQAXSVQMHS-UHFFFAOYSA-O
- SMILES: [NH3+]N
- Except where otherwise noted, data are given for materials in their standard state (at 25 °C [77 °F], 100 kPa). Infobox references

Hydrazinium is the cation with the formula [N_{2}H_{5}]^{+}. This cation has a methylamine-like structure ([H_{2}N−NH_{3}]^{+}). It can be derived from hydrazine by protonation (treatment with a strong acid). Hydrazinium is a weak acid with pK_{a} = 8.1.

Salts of hydrazinium are common reagents in chemistry and are often used in certain industrial processes. Notable examples are hydrazinium hydrogensulfate, N_{2}H_{6}SO_{4} or [N_{2}H_{5}]^{+}[HSO_{4}]^{−}, and hydrazinium azide, N_{5}H_{5} or [N_{2}H_{5}]^{+}[N_{3}]^{−}. In the common names of such salts, the cation is often called "hydrazine", as in "hydrazine sulfate" for hydrazinium hydrogensulfate.

The terms "hydrazinium" and "hydrazine" may also be used for the doubly protonated cation [N_{2}H_{6}]^{2+}, more properly called hydrazinediium or hydrazinium(2+). This cation has an ethane-like structure ([H_{3}N−NH_{3}]^{2+}). Salts of this cation include hydrazinediium sulfate [N_{2}H_{6}]^{2+}[SO_{4}]^{2−} and hydrazinediium bis(6-carboxypyridazine-3-carboxylate), [N_{2}H_{6}]^{2+}([C_{6}H_{3}N_{2}O_{4}]^{−})_{2}.

== See also ==
- Ammonium, [NH_{4}]^{+}
