= Hydrazinium nitroformate =

Names
- IUPAC name Hydrazine; trinitromethane
- Other names: Hydrazine nitroform; Hydrazinium trinitromethanide; Hydrazinium trinitromethide; Hydrazine, compd. with trinitromethane (1:1)

Identifiers
| CAS Number | 14913-74-7; 4682-01-3 |
| 3D model (JSmol) | Interactive image |
| ECHA InfoCard | 100.101.390 |
| EC Number | 414-850-9 |
| PubChem CID | 129868016 |
- InChI: InChI=1S/CN3O6.H4N2/c5-2(6)1(3(7)8)4(9)10;1-2/h;1-2H2/q-1;/p+1 Key: DTXWOSBMROEDNN-UHFFFAOYSA-O
- SMILES: N[NH3+].[O-][N+](=O)[C-]([N+]([O-])=O)[N+]([O-])=O

Properties
| Chemical formula | [H_{2}NNH_{3}]^{+}[C(NO_{2})_{3}]^{−} |
| Molar mass | 183.080 g·mol^{−1} |
| Appearance | Colorless or white crystalline solid |
| Density | 1.86 g⋅cm^{−3} |
| Melting point | 121–125 °C (250–257 °F; 394–398 K) |

Structure
| Crystal structure | Monoclinic |
| Space group | P2_{1}/n |
| Lattice constant | a = 7.91±0.02 Å, b = 11.77±0.02 Å, c = 13.98±0.02 Å α = 90°, β = 104.92°, γ = 90° |
| Formula units (Z) | 8 |

Thermochemistry
| Std enthalpy of formation (Δ_{f}H^{⦵}_{298}) | −72 kJ⋅mol^{−1} |
| Enthalpy of vaporization (Δ_{f}H_{vap}) | 164.8 kJ⋅mol^{−1} |

Explosive data
| Shock sensitivity | BAM Apparatus: <1 N⋅m (Impure); 1.5 N⋅m (Pure); 3 N⋅m (Ultra-pure) |
| Friction sensitivity | 25 N |
- Except where otherwise noted, data are given for materials in their standard state (at 25 °C [77 °F], 100 kPa). Infobox references

Hydrazinium nitroformate (HNF) is a salt of hydrazine and nitroform (trinitromethane). It has the molecular formula [H_{2}NNH_{3}]^{+}[C(NO_{2})_{3}]^{−} and is soluble in most solvents.

Hydrazinium nitroformate is an energetic oxidizer. It is specifically proposed as the oxidizing component of solid rocket fuels. It is considered a greener rocket fuel because, unlike perchlorate-based oxidants, it does not contain chlorine, which is an ozone-depleting substance.

Hydrazinium nitroformate tends to produce propellants which burn very rapidly and with very high combustion efficiency. Its high energy leads to high specific impulse (I_{sp}) propellants. Replacement of ammonium perchlorate (AP) in ammonium perchlorate composite propellant results in a 7% increase in I_{sp} and a 10% increase in payload capacity. Flame temperature increases greatly, with a simple 80% HNF / 20% HTPB combination burning at a temperature of 3,132 K (2,859 °C; 5,178 °F) vs. 1,420 K (1,150 °C; 2,100 °F) for the same ratio of AP to HTPB.

A disadvantage of HNF as rocket fuel is its incompatibility with common binders and curing agents used in current fuels. Manipulation of crystal morphology and synthetic methods to achieve high purity can improve performance.
