= Acetone imine =

Chemical compound

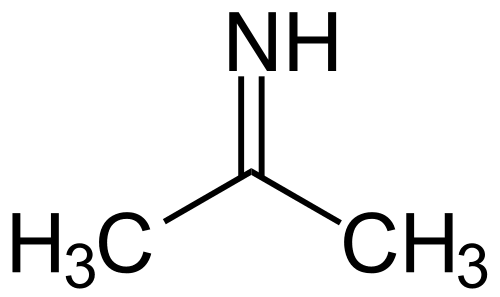
Full structural formula of acetone imine with dimensions
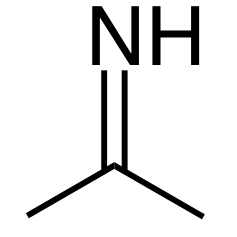
Skeletal formula of acetone imine
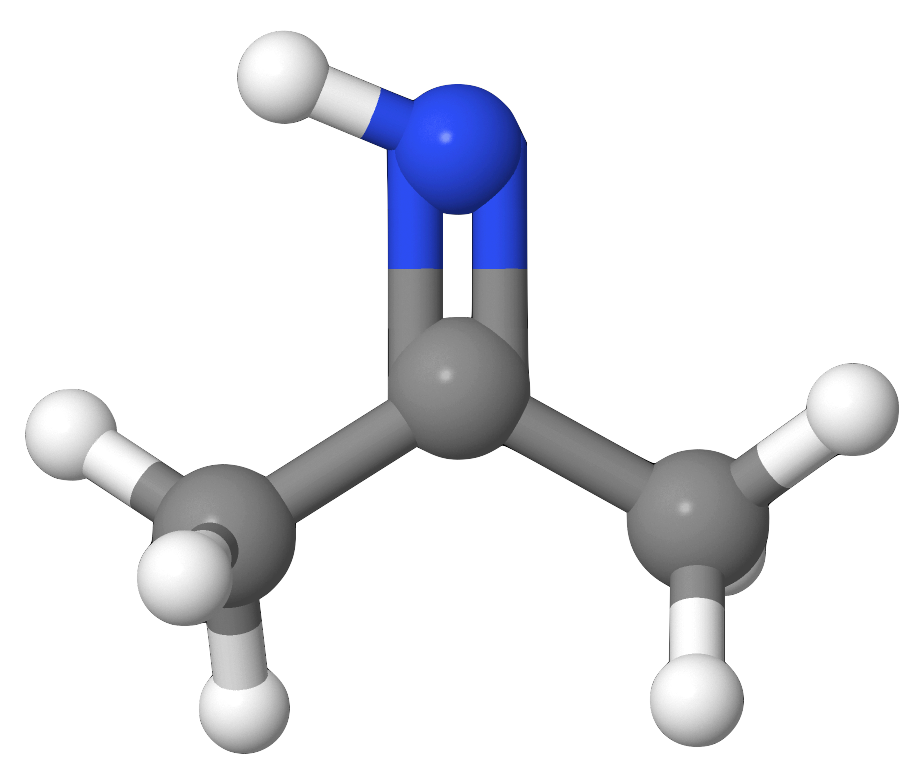
Ball-and-stick model of acetone imine
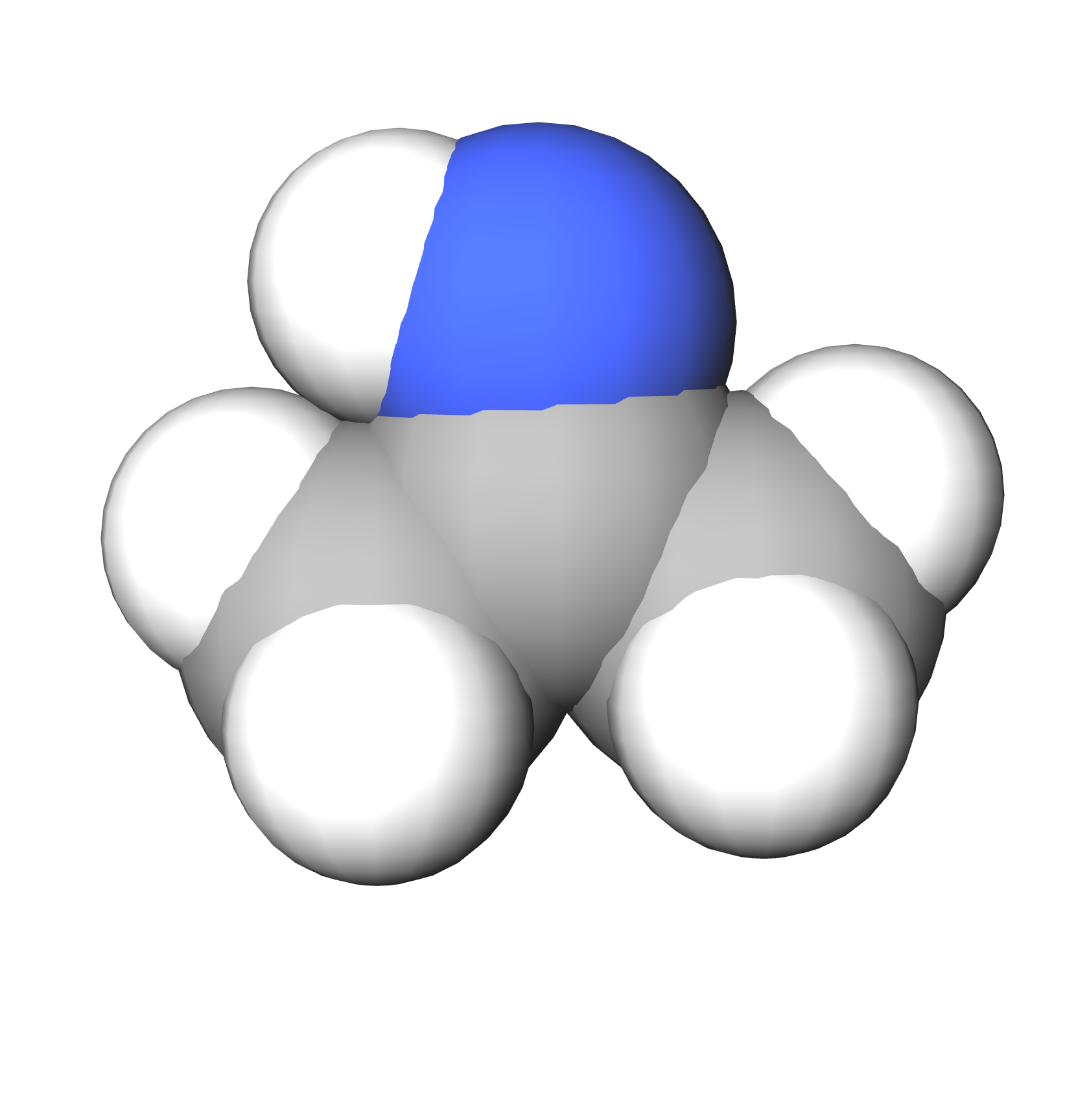
Space-filling model of acetone imine

Names
- Preferred IUPAC name Propan-2-imine
- Other names: Acetone imine; 2-Propanimine

Identifiers
CAS Number	38697-07-3
3D model (JSmol)	Interactive image
ChemSpider	125534
MeSH	Imine Acetone Imine
PubChem CID	142304
CompTox Dashboard (EPA)	DTXSID50191992
- InChI: InChI=1S/C3H7N/c1-3(2)4/h4H,1-2H3 Key: XDAGXZXKTKRFMT-UHFFFAOYSA-N
- SMILES: CC(=N)C

Properties
Chemical formula	C_{3}H_{7}N
Molar mass	57.096 g·mol^{−1}
Appearance	colorless liquid
Density	0.8 g cm^{−3} (25 °C)
Boiling point	57–59 °C (135–138 °F; 330–332 K)
log P	−0.56
Refractive index (n_{D})	1.394

Hazards
- GHS labelling
Pictograms	(GHS02: Flammable) (GHS07: Exclamation mark)
Signal word	Danger
Hazard statements	H225, H319, H336
Precautionary statements	P210, P261, P305+P351+P338
NFPA 704 (fire diamond)	0 3 0 W
Flash point	14.7 °C (58.5 °F; 287.8 K)

Related compounds
Related compounds	Acetone oxime
- Except where otherwise noted, data are given for materials in their standard state (at 25 °C [77 °F], 100 kPa). Infobox references

Acetone imine, or 2-propanimine is an organic compound and an imine with the chemical formula (CH_{3})_{2}CNH. It is a volatile and flammable liquid at room temperature. It is the simplest ketimine. This compound is mainly of academic interest.

== Synthesis and reactions ==
Acetone imine is prepared by dehydrocyanation of the cyanoamine of acetone, which is prepared from acetone cyanohydrin. Dicyclohexylcarbodiimide (CyN=C=NCy) serves as the scavenger for hydrogen cyanide:

(CH_{3})_{2}C(NH_{2})CN + CyN=C=NCy → (CH_{3})_{2}CNH + CyN(H)-C(CN)=NCy

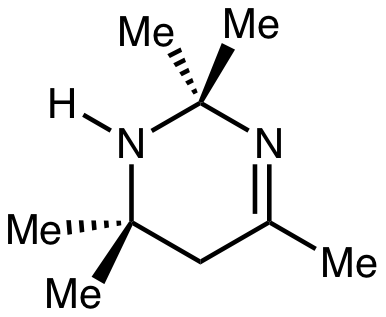
Upon standing at room temperature, samples of acetone imine degrade to give this heterocycle, called acetonin.

The compound hydrolyzes readily:

(CH_{3})_{2}CNH + H_{2}O → (CH_{3})_{2}CO + NH_{3}

This reactivity is characteristic of imines derived from ammonia. Methylene imine (CH_{2}=NH) is also highly reactive, condensing to hexamethylenetetramine. Upon standing, acetone imine undergoes further condensation to give the tetrahydropyrimidine called acetonin, with loss of ammonia.

The imine of hexafluoroacetone, ((CF_{3})_{2}C=NH) is by contrast robust.
