= Hydrazine sulfate =

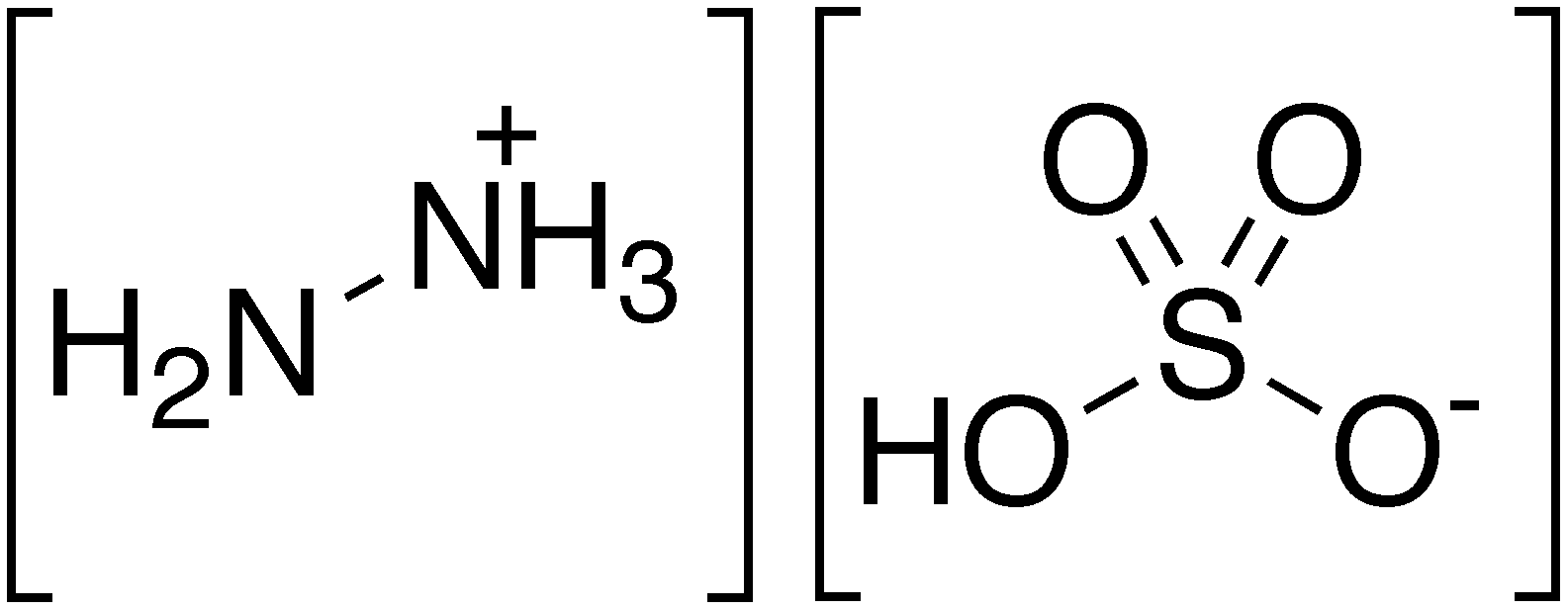

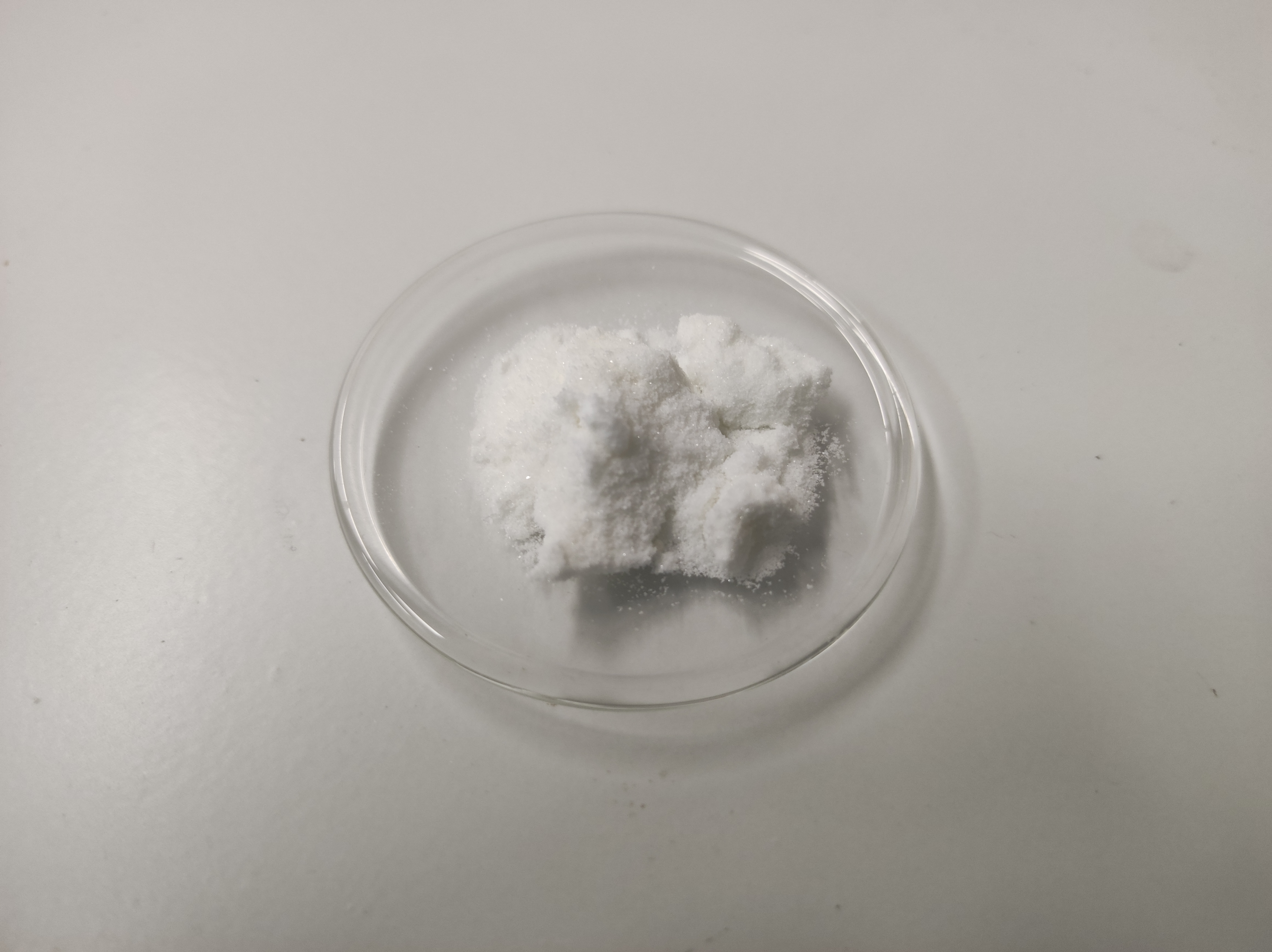

Names
- IUPAC name Hydrazinium hydrogen sulfate
- Other names: Hydrazinium sulfate; Hydrazinium hydrogensulfate

Identifiers
CAS Number	10034-93-2
3D model (JSmol)	Interactive image
ChemSpider	23225
ECHA InfoCard	100.030.088
EC Number	233-110-4
PubChem CID	24842
UNII	1N369SAT01
CompTox Dashboard (EPA)	DTXSID8020703
- InChI: InChI=1S/H4N2.H2O4S/c1-2;1-5(2,3)4/h1-2H2;(H2,1,2,3,4) Key: ZGCHATBSUIJLRL-UHFFFAOYSA-N; InChI=1/H4N2.H2O4S/c1-2;1-5(2,3)4/h1-2H2;(H2,1,2,3,4) Key: ZGCHATBSUIJLRL-UHFFFAOYAL
- SMILES: [NH3+]N.S(=O)(=O)(O)[O-]

Properties
Chemical formula	[N_{2}H_{5}]^{+}[HSO_{4}]^{−}
Molar mass	130.12 g·mol^{−1}
Appearance	colourless crystals or white powder
Density	1.37 g/cm^{3}
Melting point	254°C
Boiling point	decomposes
Solubility in water	30 g/L (20°C)

Hazards
- GHS labelling
Pictograms	(GHS06: Toxic) (GHS09: Environmental hazard) (GHS05: Corrosive)
NFPA 704 (fire diamond)	3 1 0
Safety data sheet (SDS)	External MSDS
- Except where otherwise noted, data are given for materials in their standard state (at 25 °C [77 °F], 100 kPa). verify (what is ?) Infobox references

Hydrazine sulfate, more properly hydrazinium hydrogensulfate, is a salt of the cation hydrazinium and the anion bisulfate (hydrogensulfate), with the formula N_{2}H_{6}SO_{4} or more properly [N_{2}H_{5}]^{+}[HSO_{4}]^{−}. It is a white, water-soluble solid at room temperature.

Hydrazine sulfate has a number of uses in chemical laboratories and in the chemical industry, including analytical chemistry and the synthesis of organic compounds. In those uses it is usually preferred to pure hydrazine, because it is not volatile and is less susceptible to atmospheric oxidation on storage.

== Preparation ==
The compound can be prepared by treating an aqueous solution of hydrazine (N_{2}H_{4}) with sulfuric acid (H_{2}SO_{4}).

== Laboratory and industrial uses ==
Besides its general use as a safe source of hydrazine, the compound is used as a catalyst in making fibers out of acetate, in the analysis and synthesis of minerals, and testing for arsenic in metals.

== Medical uses ==
Hydrazine sulfate can be used as a fungicide and antiseptic.

Hydrazine sulfate has been used as an alternative medical treatment for the loss of appetite (anorexia) and rapid weight loss (cachexia), which are often associated with cancer.

=== Legal status ===
Although it has been marketed as a dietary supplement, hydrazine sulfate has never been approved in the United States as safe and effective in treating any medical condition.

=== History ===
Hydrazine sulfate was first proposed as an anti-cancer agent by U.S. physician Joseph Gold in the mid-1970s. Gold's arguments were based on the fact that cancer cells are often unusually dependent on glycolysis for energy (the Warburg effect). Gold proposed that the body might offset this increased glycolysis using gluconeogenesis, which is the pathway that is the reverse of glycolysis. Since this process would require a great deal of energy, Gold thought that inhibiting gluconeogenesis might reverse this energy requirement and be an effective treatment for cancer cachexia. Hydrazine is a reactive chemical that in the test tube can inactivate one of the enzymes needed for gluconeogenesis, phosphoenolpyruvate carboxykinase (PEP-CK). It was also postulated that if tumor energy gain (glycolysis) and host-energy loss (gluconeogenesis) were functionally interrelated, inhibition of gluconeogenesis at PEP CK could result in actual tumor regression in addition to reversal or arrest of cancer cachexia. In this model, hydrazine sulfate is therefore thought to act by irreversibly inhibiting the enzyme phosphoenolpyruvate carboxykinase.

The use of hydrazine sulfate as a cancer remedy was popularized by the magazine Penthouse in the mid-1990s, when Kathy Keeton, wife and business partner of the magazine's publisher Bob Guccione, used it in an attempt to treat her metastatic breast cancer. Alternative medicine nutritionist Gary Null wrote three of the articles about alternative cancer treatments, including one titled "The Great Cancer Fraud." Keeton (until her death in 1997) and other supporters of hydrazine sulfate treatment accused the U.S. National Cancer Institute (NCI) of deliberately hiding the beneficial effects of the compound, and threatened to launch a class action lawsuit. The NCI denied the claims, and says that there is little to no evidence that hydrazine sulfate has any beneficial effects whatsoever. The position of the NCI was supported by an inquiry held by the General Accounting Office.

=== Clinical evaluation ===
A review of the clinical research concluded that hydrazine sulfate has never been shown to act as an anticancer agent; patients do not experience remissions or regressions of their cancer, and patients do not live longer than non-treated patients. Some academic reviews of alternative cancer treatments have described the compound as a "disproved and ineffective treatment for cancer".

Joseph Gold's claims have been questioned by the American Cancer Society, and other investigators have been unable to repeat or confirm these results. Gold is reported not to trust the motives or results of other investigators, with CNN quoting him as stating that "they've been out to get hydrazine sulfate, and I don't know why".

In response to these results, an uncontrolled clinical trial was carried out at the Petrov Research Institute of Oncology in St. Petersburg over a period of 17 years, and a controlled trial was carried out at the Harbor-UCLA Medical Center in California over period of 10 years, respectively. The Russian trial reported complete tumor regression in about 1% of cases, a partial response in about 3% of cases and some subjective improvement of symptoms in about half of the patients. The National Cancer Institute analysis of this trial notes that interpretation of these data is difficult, due to the absence of controls, the lack of information on prior treatment and the study's reliance on subjective assessments of symptoms (i.e. asking patients if the drug had made them feel any better). Overall, the trials in California saw no statistically significant effect on survival from hydrazine sulfate treatment, but noted increased calorie intake in treated patients versus controls. The authors also performed a post-hoc analysis on one or more subgroups of these patients, which they reported as suggesting a beneficial effect from treatment. The design and interpretation of this trial, and in particular the validity of this subgroup analysis, was criticized in detail in an editorial in the Journal of Clinical Oncology.

Later randomized controlled trials failed to find any improvement in survival, For example, in a trial of the treatment of advanced lung cancer, with either cisplatin and vinblastine or these drugs plus hydrazine sulfate, saw complete tumor regression in 4% of the hydrazine group, versus 3% in the control group, and tumor progression in 36% of the hydrazine group, versus 30% of the control group; however, none of these differences were statistically significant. Some trials even found both significantly decreased survival and significantly poorer quality of life in those patients receiving hydrazine sulfate. These consistently negative results have resulted in hydrazine sulfate being described as a "disproven cancer therapy" in a recent medical review. Similarly, other reviews have concluded that there is "strong evidence" against the use of hydrazine sulfate to treat anorexia or weight loss in cancer patients.

=== Side effects ===
Hydrazine sulfate is toxic and potentially carcinogenic. Nevertheless, the short-term side effects reported in various clinical trials are relatively mild: minor nausea and vomiting, dizziness and excitement, polyneuritis (inflammation of the nerves) and difficulties in fine muscle control (such as writing). However, more serious, even fatal side effects have been reported in rare cases: one patient developed fatal liver and kidney failure, and another developed serious symptoms of neurotoxicity. These side effects and other reports of hydrazine toxicity are consistent with the hypothesis that hydrazine may play a role in the toxicity of the antibiotic isoniazid, which is thought to be metabolized to hydrazine in the body.

Hydrazine sulfate is also a monoamine oxidase inhibitor (MAOI), and is incompatible with alcohol, tranquilizers and sleeping pills (benzodiazepines and barbiturates), and other psycho-active drugs, with pethidine (meperidine, Demerol), and with foods containing significant amounts of the amino acid breakdown product tyramine, such as aged cheeses, raisins, avocados, processed and cured fish and meats, fermented products, and others.
