= Hydrazine =

Colorless flammable liquid with an ammonia-like odor

Skeletal formula of hydrazine with all explicit hydrogens added
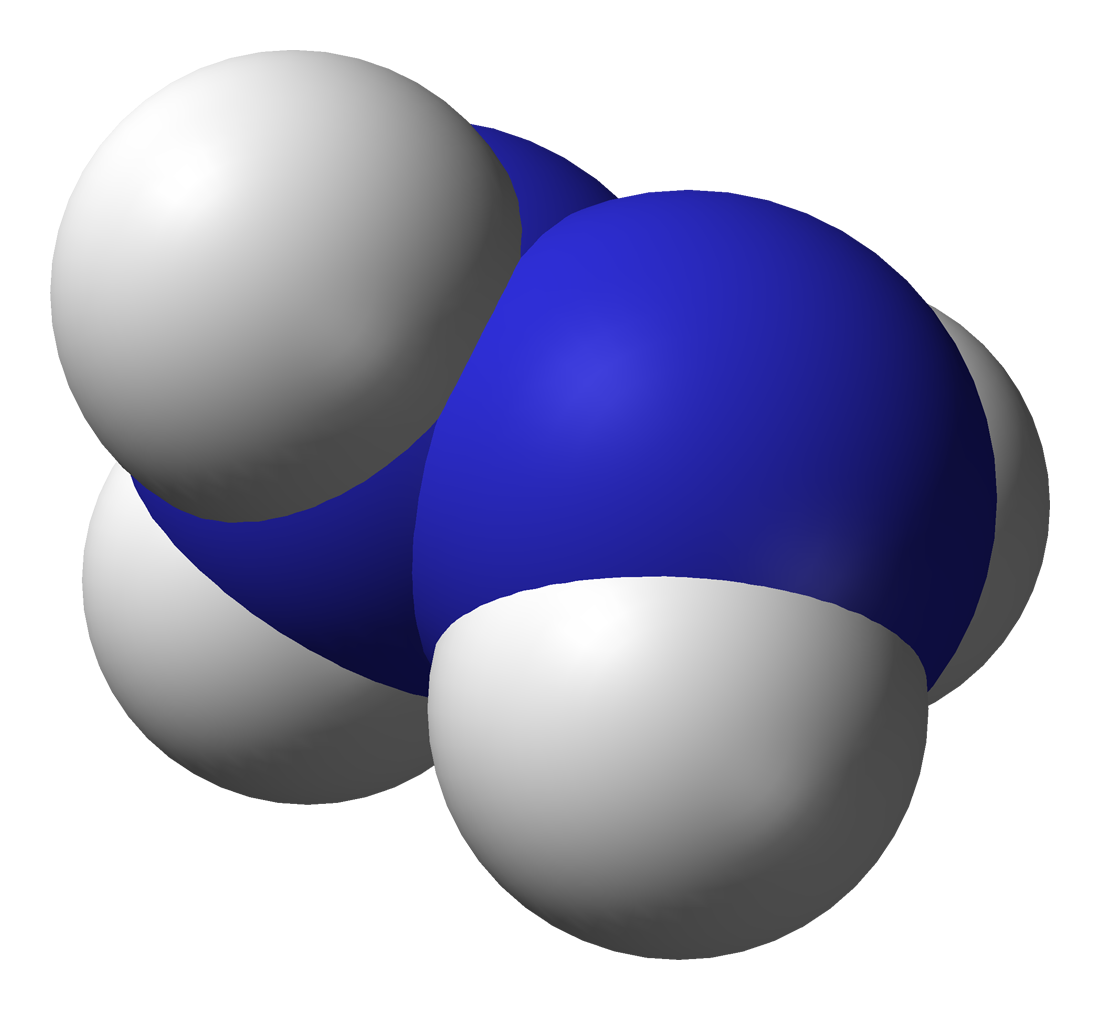
Spacefill model of hydrazine
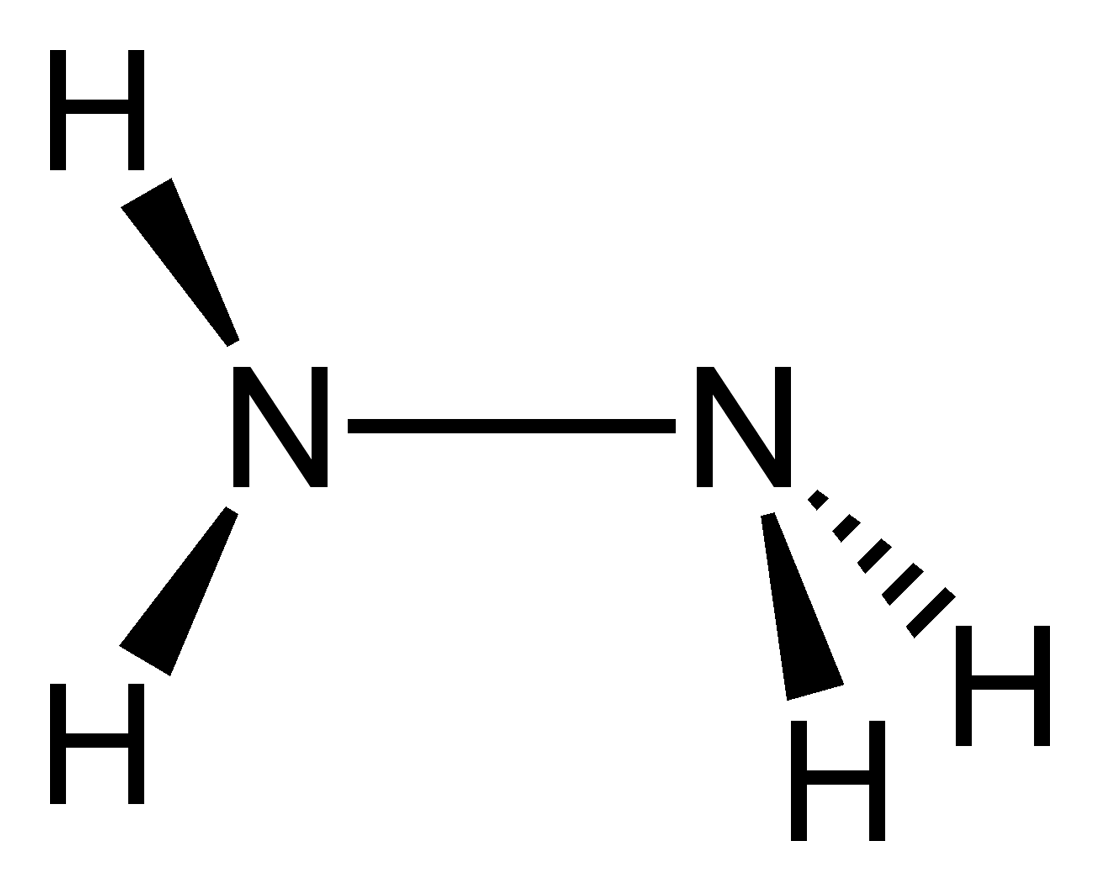
Stereo, skeletal formula of hydrazine with all explicit hydrogens added
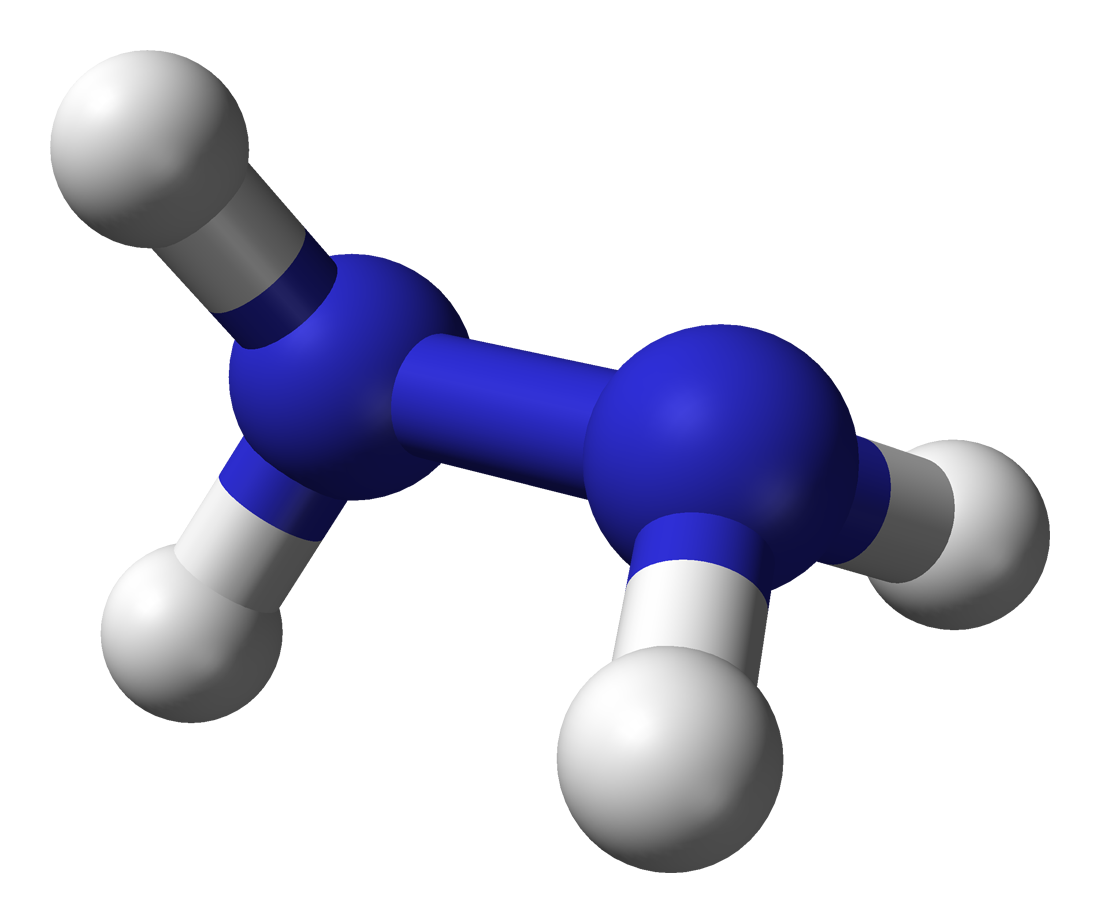
Ball and stick model of hydrazine
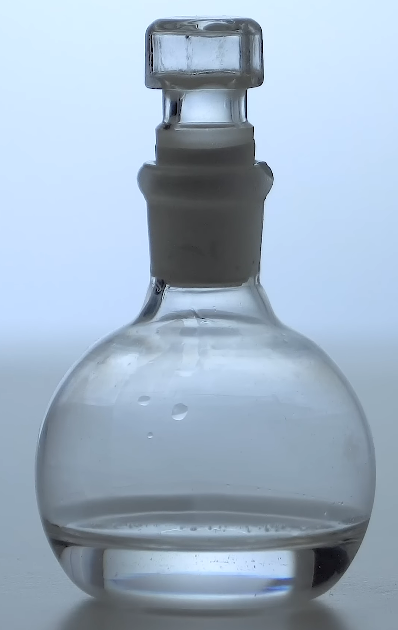
- Anhydrous hydrazine

Names
- IUPAC name Hydrazine
- Systematic IUPAC name Diazane
- Other names Diamine; Tetrahydridodinitrogen(N-N); Diamidogen

Identifiers
CAS Number	302-01-2
3D model (JSmol)	Interactive image
Beilstein Reference	878137
ChEBI	CHEBI:15571
ChEMBL	ChEMBL1237174
ChemSpider	8960
ECHA InfoCard	100.005.560
EC Number	206-114-9
Gmelin Reference	190
KEGG	C05361
MeSH	Hydrazine
PubChem CID	9321
RTECS number	MU7175000
UNII	27RFH0GB4R
UN number	2029
CompTox Dashboard (EPA)	DTXSID3020702
- InChI: InChI=1S/H4N2/c1-2/h1-2H2 Key: OAKJQQAXSVQMHS-UHFFFAOYSA-N; InChI=1/H4N2/c1-2/h1-2H2 Key: OAKJQQAXSVQMHS-UHFFFAOYAZ
- SMILES: NN

Properties
Chemical formula	N_{2}H_{4}
Molar mass	32.046 g·mol^{−1}
Appearance	Colorless, fuming, oily liquid
Odor	Ammonia-like
Density	1.021 g/cm^{3}
Melting point	2 °C; 35 °F; 275 K
Boiling point	114 °C; 237 °F; 387 K
Solubility in water	Miscible
log P	0.67
Vapor pressure	1 kPa (at 30.7 °C)
Acidity (pK_{a})	8.10 ([N_{2}H_{5}]^{+})
Basicity (pK_{b})	5.90
Conjugate acid	Hydrazinium
Refractive index (n_{D})	1.46044 (at 22 °C)
Viscosity	0.876 cP

Structure
Molecular shape	Triangular pyramidal at N
Dipole moment	1.85 D

Thermochemistry
Std molar entropy (S^{⦵}_{298})	121.52 J/(K·mol)
Std enthalpy of formation (Δ_{f}H^{⦵}_{298})	50.63 kJ/mol

Hazards
- GHS labelling
Pictograms	(GHS02: Flammable) (GHS05: Corrosive) (GHS06: Toxic) (GHS08: Health hazard) (GHS09: Environmental hazard)
Signal word	Danger
Hazard statements	H226, H301, H311, H314, H317, H331, H350, H410
Precautionary statements	P201, P261, P273, P280, P301+P310, P305+P351+P338
NFPA 704 (fire diamond)	4 4 3
Flash point	52 °C (126 °F; 325 K)
Autoignition temperature	24 to 270 °C (75 to 518 °F; 297 to 543 K)
Explosive limits	1.8–100%
- Lethal dose or concentration (LD, LC)
LD_{50} (median dose)	59–60 mg/kg (oral in rats, mice)
LC_{50} (median concentration)	260 ppm (rat, 4 h); 630 ppm (rat, 1 h); 570 ppm (rat, 4 h); 252 ppm (mouse, 4 h)
- NIOSH (US health exposure limits)
PEL (Permissible)	TWA 1 ppm (1.3 mg/m^{3}) [skin]
REL (Recommended)	Ca C 0.03 ppm (0.04 mg/m^{3}) [2-hour]
IDLH (Immediate danger)	Ca [50 ppm]
Safety data sheet (SDS)	ICSC 0281

Related compounds
Other anions	Tetrafluorohydrazine; Hydrogen peroxide Diphosphane; Diphosphorus tetraiodide
Other cations	Organic hydrazines
Related Binary azanes	Ammonia; Triazane
Related compounds	Diazene; Triazene; Tetrazene; Diphosphene
- Except where otherwise noted, data are given for materials in their standard state (at 25 °C [77 °F], 100 kPa). verify (what is ?) Infobox references

Hydrazine is an inorganic compound with the chemical formula N_{2}H_{4}. It is a simple pnictogen hydride, and is a colourless flammable liquid with an ammonia-like odour. Hydrazine is highly hazardous unless handled in solution as, for example, hydrazine hydrate (N_{2}H_{4}·xH_{2}O).

Hydrazine is mainly used as a foaming agent in preparing polymer foams, but applications also include its uses as a precursor to pharmaceuticals and agrochemicals, as well as a long-term storable propellant for in-space spacecraft propulsion. Additionally, hydrazine is used in various rocket fuels and to prepare the gas precursors used in airbags. Hydrazine is used within both nuclear and conventional electrical power plant steam cycles as an oxygen scavenger to control concentrations of dissolved oxygen in an effort to reduce corrosion. As of 2000, approximately 120,000 tons of hydrazine hydrate (corresponding to a 64% solution of hydrazine in water by weight) were manufactured worldwide per year.

Hydrazines are a class of organic substances derived by replacing one or more hydrogen atoms in hydrazine by an organic group.

In 2019, the first examples of isomorphism between organic hydrazinosolvates and their corresponding hydrates were discovered, demonstrating that hydrazine molecules can undergo isomorphous substitution by water within crystalline frameworks such as 18-crown-6 complexes.

== Etymology and history ==
The name "hydrazine" was coined by Emil Fischer in 1875; he was trying to produce organic compounds that consisted of mono-substituted hydrazine. By 1887, Theodor Curtius had produced hydrazine sulfate by treating organic diazides with dilute sulfuric acid; however, he was unable to obtain pure hydrazine, despite repeated efforts. Pure anhydrous hydrazine was first prepared by the Dutch chemist Lobry de Bruyn in 1895.

The nomenclature is a bi-valent form, with prefix hydr- used to indicate the presence of hydrogen atoms and suffix beginning with -az-, from azote, the French word for nitrogen.

== Applications ==
=== Gas producers and propellants ===
The largest use of hydrazine is as a precursor to blowing agents. Specific compounds include azodicarbonamide and azobisisobutyronitrile, which produce 100–200 mL of gas per gram of precursor. In a related application, sodium azide, the gas-forming agent in airbags, is produced from hydrazine by reaction with sodium nitrite.

Hydrazine is also used as a long-term storable propellant on board space vehicles, such as the Dawn mission to Ceres and Vesta, and to both reduce the concentration of dissolved oxygen in and control pH of water used in large industrial boilers. The F-16 fighter jet, Space Shuttle, and U-2 spy plane use hydrazine to fuel their Emergency Start System in the event of an engine stall. The Space Shuttle and its solid rocket boosters used hydrazine in their auxiliary power units to produce hydraulic power for engine gimbaling and control of aerodynamic surfaces.

=== Precursor to pesticides and pharmaceuticals ===
Fluconazole, synthesized using hydrazine, is an antifungal medication.

Hydrazine is a precursor to several pharmaceuticals and pesticides. Often these applications involve conversion of hydrazine to heterocyclic rings such as pyrazoles and pyridazines. Examples of commercialized bioactive hydrazine derivatives include cefazolin, rizatriptan, anastrozole, fluconazole, metazachlor, metamitron, metribuzin, paclobutrazol, diclobutrazole, propiconazole, hydrazine sulfate, diimide, triadimefon, and the diacylhydrazine insecticides.

Hydrazine compounds can be effective as active ingredients in insecticides, miticides, nematicides, fungicides, antiviral agents, attractants, herbicides, or plant growth regulators.

=== Small-scale, niche, and research ===
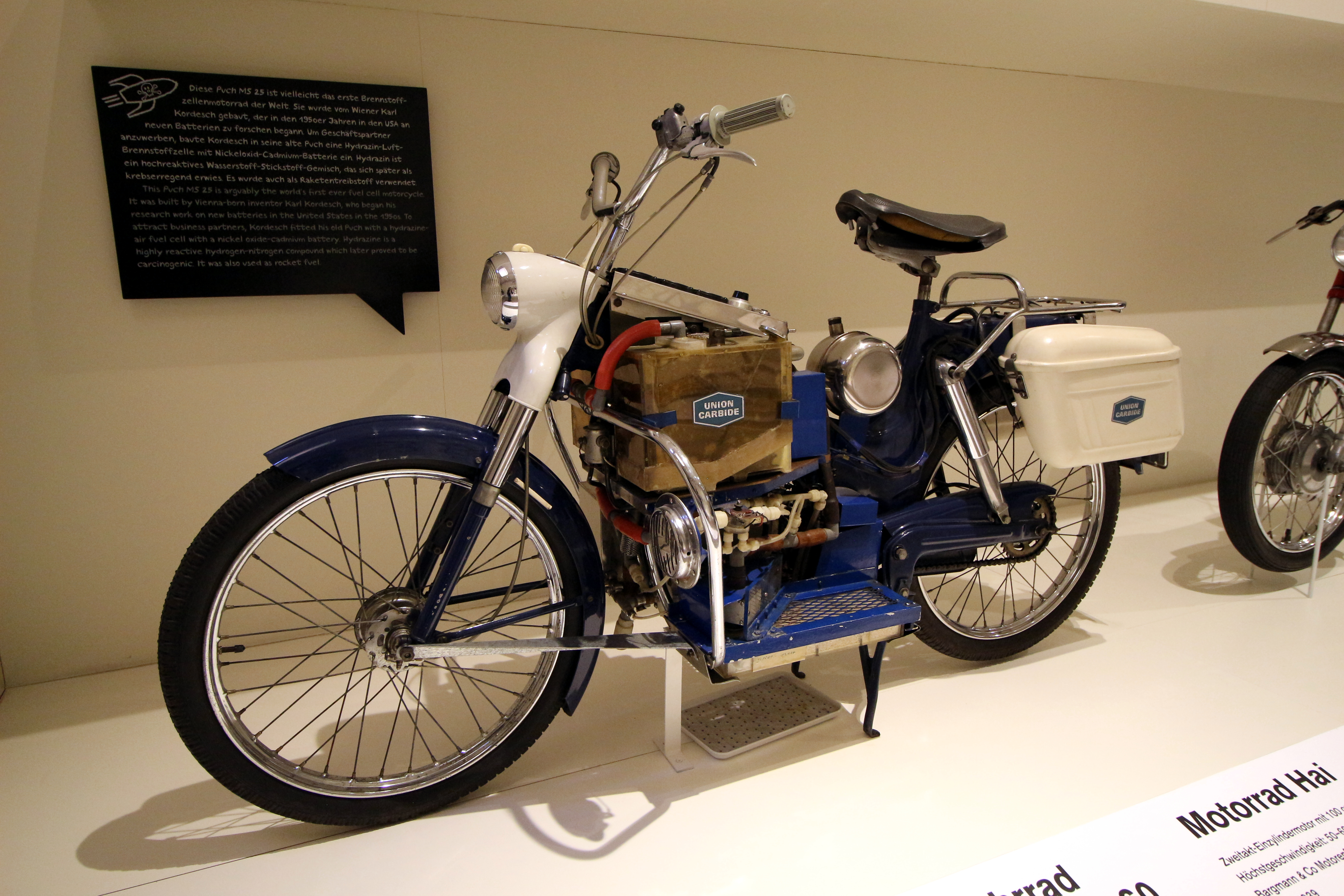
Puch Ms 25 motorcycle with a hydrazine-air fuel cell, arguably the world's first ever fuel cell motorcycle, developed by Karl Kordesch

The Italian catalyst manufacturer Acta (chemical company) has proposed using hydrazine as an alternative to hydrogen in fuel cells. The chief benefit of using hydrazine is that it can produce over 200 mW/cm^{2} more than a similar hydrogen cell without requiring (expensive) platinum catalysts. Because the fuel is liquid at room temperature, it can be handled and stored more easily than hydrogen. By storing the hydrazine in a tank full of a double-bonded carbon-oxygen carbonyl, the fuel reacts and forms a safe solid called hydrazone. By then flushing the tank with warm water, the liquid hydrazine hydrate is released. Hydrazine has a higher electromotive force of 1.56 V compared to 1.23 V for hydrogen. Hydrazine breaks down in the cell to form nitrogen and hydrogen which bonds with oxygen, releasing water. Hydrazine was used in fuel cells manufactured by Allis-Chalmers Corp., including some that provided electric power in space satellites in the 1960s.

A mixture of 63% hydrazine, 32% hydrazine nitrate and 5% water is a standard propellant for experimental bulk-loaded liquid propellant artillery. The propellant mixture above is one of the most predictable and stable, with a flat pressure profile during firing. Misfires are usually caused by inadequate ignition. The movement of the shell after a mis-ignition causes a large bubble with a larger ignition surface area, and the greater rate of gas production causes very high pressure, sometimes including catastrophic tube failures (i.e. explosions). From January–June 1991, the U.S. Army Research Laboratory conducted a review of early bulk-loaded liquid propellant gun programs for possible relevance to the electrothermal chemical propulsion program.

The United States Air Force (USAF) regularly uses H-70, a 70% hydrazine 30% water mixture, in operations employing the General Dynamics F-16 Fighting Falcon fighter aircraft and the Lockheed U-2 "Dragon Lady" reconnaissance aircraft. The single jet engine F-16 utilizes hydrazine to power its Emergency Power Unit (EPU), which provides emergency electrical and hydraulic power in the event of an engine flame out. The EPU activates automatically, or manually by pilot control, in the event of loss of hydraulic pressure or electrical power in order to provide emergency flight controls. The single jet engine U-2 utilizes hydrazine to power its Emergency Starting System (ESS), which provides a highly reliable method to restart the engine in flight in the event of a stall.

=== Rocket fuel ===
1958 NASA hypergolic propellant experiment displaying combination effects of nitrogen tetroxide with hydrazine

Hydrazine was first used as a component in rocket fuels during World War II. A 30% mix by weight with 57% methanol (named M-Stoff in the German Luftwaffe) and 13% water was called C-Stoff by the Germans. The mixture was used to power the Messerschmitt Me 163B rocket-powered fighter plane, in which the German high test peroxide T-Stoff was used as an oxidizer. Unmixed hydrazine was referred to as B-Stoff by the Germans, a designation also used later for the ethanol/water fuel for the V-2 missile.

Hydrazine is used as a low-power monopropellant for the maneuvering (RCS/Reaction control system) thrusters of spacecraft, and was used to power the Space Shuttle's auxiliary power units (APUs). In addition, mono-propellant hydrazine-fueled rocket engines are often used in terminal descent of spacecraft. Such engines were used on the Viking program landers in the 1970s as well as the Mars landers Phoenix (May 2008), Curiosity (August 2012), and Perseverance (February 2021).

During the Soviet space program, unsymmetrical dimethylhydrazine (also discovered by Fischer in 1875) was used instead of hydrazine. Together with nitric oxidizers it became known as "devil's venom" due to its highly dangerous nature.

In all hydrazine mono-propellant engines, the hydrazine is passed over a catalyst such as iridium metal supported by high-surface-area alumina (aluminium oxide), which causes it to decompose into ammonia (NH_{3}), nitrogen gas (N_{2}), and hydrogen (H_{2}) gas according to the three following reactions:

Reaction 1: N_{2}H_{4} → N_{2} + 2 H_{2}
Reaction 2: 3 N_{2}H_{4} → 4 NH_{3} + N_{2}
Reaction 3: 4 NH_{3} + N_{2}H_{4} → 3 N_{2} + 8 H_{2}

The first two reactions are extremely exothermic (the catalyst chamber can reach 800 °C (1,470 °F) in a matter of milliseconds,) and they produce large volumes of hot gas from a small volume of liquid, making hydrazine a fairly efficient thruster propellant with a vacuum specific impulse of about 220 seconds. Reaction 2 is the most exothermic, but produces a smaller number of molecules than that of reaction 1. Reaction 3 is endothermic and reverts the effect of reaction 2 back to the same effect as reaction 1 alone (lower temperature, greater number of molecules). The catalyst structure affects the proportion of the NH_{3} that is dissociated in reaction 3; a higher temperature is desirable for rocket thrusters, while more molecules are desirable when the reactions are intended to produce greater quantities of gas.

Since hydrazine is a solid below 2 °C (36 °F), it is not suitable as a general purpose rocket propellant for military applications. Other variants of hydrazine that are used as rocket fuel are monomethylhydrazine, CH_{3}NHNH_{2}, also known as MMH (melting point −52 °C (−62 °F)), and unsymmetrical dimethylhydrazine, (CH_{3})_{2}NNH_{2}, also known as UDMH (melting point −57 °C (−71 °F)). These derivatives are used in two-component rocket fuels, often together with dinitrogen tetroxide, N_{2}O_{4}. A 50:50 mixture by weight of hydrazine and UDMH was used in the engine of the service propulsion system of the Apollo command and service module, both the ascent and descent engines of the Apollo Lunar Module and Titan II ICBMs and is known as Aerozine 50. These reactions are extremely exothermic, and the burning is also hypergolic (it starts burning without any external ignition).

There are ongoing efforts in the aerospace industry to find a replacement for hydrazine, given its potential ban across the European Union. Promising alternatives include nitrous oxide-based propellant combinations, with development being led by commercial companies Dawn Aerospace, Impulse Space, and Launcher. The first nitrous oxide-based system ever flown in space was by D-Orbit onboard their ION Satellite Carrier in 2021, using six Dawn Aerospace B20 thrusters. Another alternative is more safe blends of hydrazine with much lower vapor pressure, hence reduced inhalation hazard. Aerojet Rocketdyne has developed the HPB-G28 blend that has 150 times lower vapor pressure, the same specific impulse, and a 35% higher density specific impulse than neat hydrazine. HPB-G28 can be used with same thrusters and catalysts as hydrazine, but has freezing point of −55 °C (−67 °F), making propellant line heating unnecessary. It contains 65% (by mol) hydrazine, 27% hydroxyethylhydrazinium nitrate (HEHN) and 8% hydrazinium nitrate.

== Occupational hazards ==
=== Health effects ===
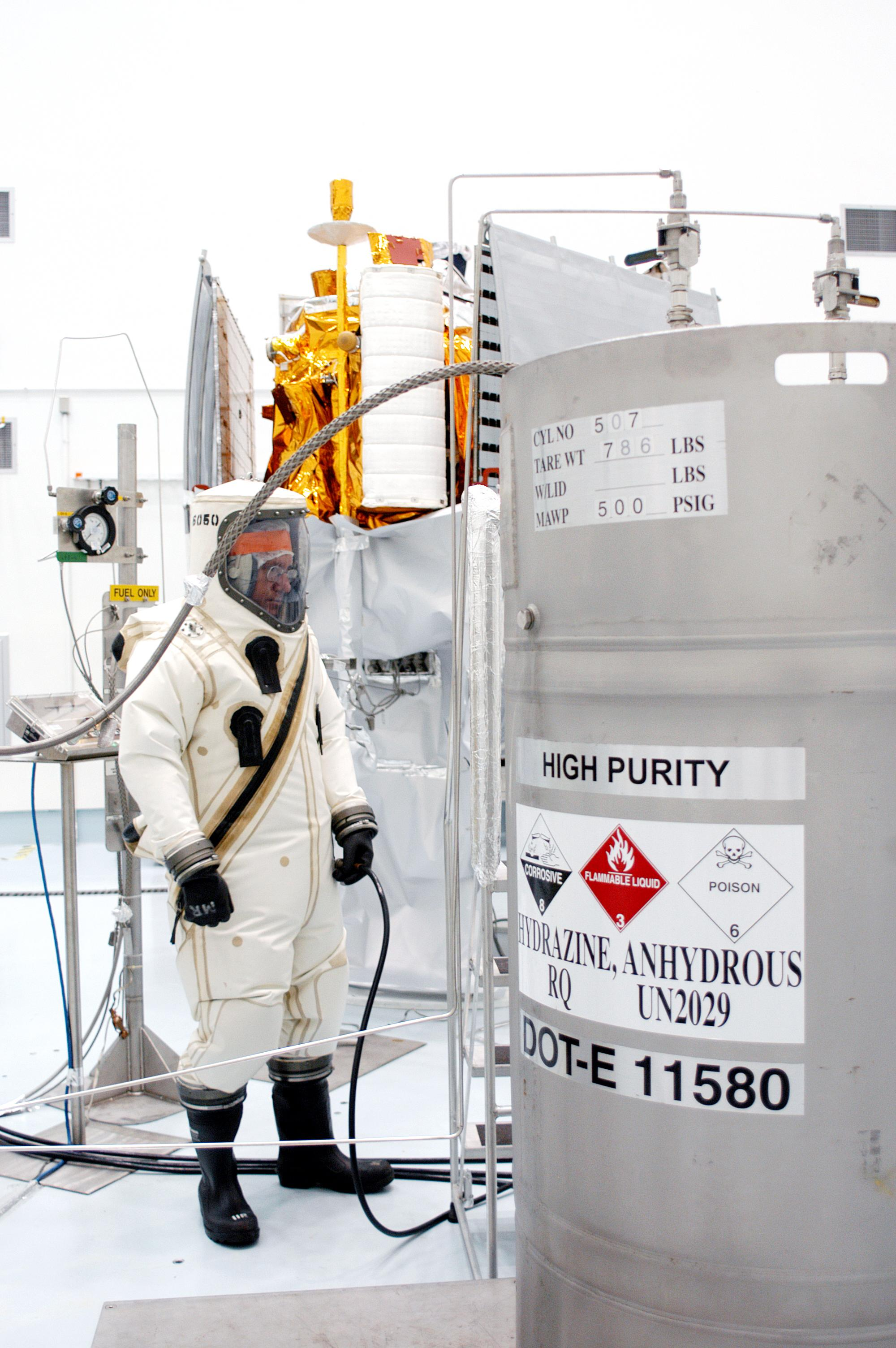
Anhydrous (pure, not in solution) hydrazine being loaded into the MESSENGER space probe (orbital reconnaissance mission of the planet Mercury). The technician is wearing a safety suit in overpressure with an external air supply.

Potential routes of hydrazine exposure include dermal, ocular, inhalation and ingestion.

Hydrazine exposure can cause skin irritation/contact dermatitis and burning, irritation to the eyes/nose/throat, nausea/vomiting, shortness of breath, pulmonary edema, headache, dizziness, central nervous system depression, lethargy, temporary blindness, seizures and coma. Exposure can also cause organ damage to the liver, kidneys and central nervous system. Hydrazine is documented as a strong skin sensitizer with potential for cross-sensitization to hydrazine derivatives following initial exposure. In addition to occupational uses reviewed above, exposure to hydrazine is also possible in small amounts from tobacco smoke.

The official U.S. guidance on hydrazine as a carcinogen is mixed but generally there is recognition of potential cancer-causing effects. The National Institute for Occupational Safety and Health (NIOSH) lists it as a "potential occupational carcinogen". The National Toxicology Program (NTP) finds it is "reasonably anticipated to be a human carcinogen". The American Conference of Governmental Industrial Hygienists (ACGIH) grades hydrazine as "A3—confirmed animal carcinogen with unknown relevance to humans". The U.S. Environmental Protection Agency (EPA) grades it as "B2—a probable human carcinogen based on animal study evidence".

The International Agency for Research on Cancer (IARC) rates hydrazine as "2A—probably carcinogenic to humans" with a positive association observed between hydrazine exposure and lung cancer. Based on cohort and cross-sectional studies of occupational hydrazine exposure, a committee from the National Academies of Sciences, Engineering and Medicine concluded that there is suggestive evidence of an association between hydrazine exposure and lung cancer, with insufficient evidence of association with cancer at other sites. The European Commission's Scientific Committee on Occupational Exposure Limits (SCOEL) places hydrazine in carcinogen "group B—a genotoxic carcinogen". The genotoxic mechanism the committee cited references hydrazine's reaction with endogenous formaldehyde and formation of a DNA-methylating agent.

In the event of a hydrazine exposure-related emergency, NIOSH recommends removing contaminated clothing immediately, washing skin with soap and water, and for eye exposure removing contact lenses and flushing eyes with water for at least 15 minutes. NIOSH also recommends anyone with potential hydrazine exposure to seek medical attention as soon as possible. There are no specific post-exposure laboratory or medical imaging recommendations, and the medical work-up may depend on the type and severity of symptoms. The World Health Organization (WHO) recommends potential exposures be treated symptomatically with special attention given to potential lung and liver damage. Past cases of hydrazine exposure have documented success with pyridoxine (vitamin B6) treatment.

=== Occupational exposure limits ===
- NIOSH Recommended Exposure Limit (REL): 0.03 ppm (0.04 mg/m^{3}) 2-hour ceiling
- OSHA Permissible Exposure Limit (PEL): 1 ppm (1.3 mg/m^{3}) 8-hour time-weighted average
- ACGIH Threshold Limit Value (TLV): 0.01 ppm (0.013 mg/m^{3}) 8-hour time-weighted average

The odor threshold for hydrazine is 3.7 ppm, thus if a worker is able to smell an ammonia-like odor then they are likely over the exposure limit. However, this odor threshold varies greatly and should not be used to determine potentially hazardous exposures.

For aerospace personnel, the United States Air Force uses an emergency exposure guideline, developed by the National Academy of Sciences Committee on Toxicology, which is utilized for non-routine exposures of the general public and is called the Short-Term Public Emergency Exposure Guideline (SPEGL). The SPEGL, which does not apply to occupational exposures, is defined as the acceptable peak concentration for unpredicted, single, short-term emergency exposures of the general public and represents rare exposures in a worker's lifetime. For hydrazine the 1-hour SPEGL is 2 ppm, with a 24-hour SPEGL of 0.08 ppm.

=== Handling and medical surveillance ===
NASA Laboratory displaying collections of common rocket-hypergolic propellants.

A complete surveillance programme for hydrazine should include systematic analysis of biologic monitoring, medical screening and morbidity/mortality information. The CDC recommends surveillance summaries and education be provided for supervisors and workers. Pre-placement and periodic medical screening should be conducted with specific focus on potential effects of hydrazine upon functioning of the eyes, skin, liver, kidneys, hematopoietic, nervous and respiratory systems.

Common controls used for hydrazine include process enclosure, local exhaust ventilation and personal protective equipment (PPE). Guidelines for hydrazine PPE include non-permeable gloves and clothing, indirect-vent splash resistant goggles, face shield and in some cases a respirator. The use of respirators for the handling of hydrazine should be the last resort as a method of controlling worker exposure. In cases where respirators are needed, proper respirator selection and a complete respiratory protection program consistent with OSHA guidelines should be implemented.

For USAF personnel, Air Force Occupational Safety and Health (AFOSH) Standard 48-8, Attachment 8 reviews the considerations for occupational exposure to hydrazine in missile, aircraft and spacecraft systems. Specific guidance for exposure response includes mandatory emergency shower and eyewash stations and a process for decontaminating protective clothing. The guidance also assigns responsibilities and requirements for proper PPE, employee training, medical surveillance and emergency response. USAF bases requiring the use of hydrazine generally have specific base regulations governing local requirements for safe hydrazine use and emergency response.

== Molecular structure ==
Hydrazine, H_{2}N−NH_{2}, contains two amine groups NH_{2} connected by a single bond between the two nitrogen atoms. Each N−NH_{2} subunit is pyramidal. The structure of the free molecules was determined by gas electron diffraction and microwave spectroscopy. The N–N single bond length is 1.447(2) Å (144.7(2) pm), the N-H distance is 1.015(2) Å, the N-N-H angles are 106(2)° and 112(2)°, the H-N-H angle is 107°. The molecule adopts a gauche conformation with a torsion angle of 91(2)° (dihedral angle between the planes containing the N-N bond and the bisectors of the H-N-H angles). The rotational barrier is twice that of ethane. These structural properties resemble those of gaseous hydrogen peroxide, which adopts a "skewed" anticlinal conformation, and also experiences a strong rotational barrier.

The structure of solid hydrazine was determined by X-ray diffraction. In this phase the N-N bond has a length of 1.46 Å and the nearest non-bonded distances are 3.19, 3.25 and 3.30 Å.

== Synthesis and production ==
Diverse synthetic pathways for hydrazine production have been developed. The key step is the creation of the N–N single bond. The many routes can be divided into those that use chlorine oxidants (and generate salt) and those that do not.

=== Oxidation of ammonia via oxaziridines from peroxide ===
Hydrazine can be synthesized from ammonia and hydrogen peroxide with a ketone catalyst, in a procedure called the Peroxide process (sometimes called Pechiney-Ugine-Kuhlmann process, the Atofina–PCUK cycle, or ketazine process). The net reaction is:

2 NH_{3} + H_{2}O_{2} → N_{2}H_{4} + 2 H_{2}O

In this route, the ketone and ammonia first condense to give the imine, which is oxidised by hydrogen peroxide to the oxaziridine, a three-membered ring containing carbon, oxygen, and nitrogen. Next, the oxaziridine gives the hydrazone by treatment with ammonia, which process creates the nitrogen-nitrogen single bond. This hydrazone condenses with one more equivalent of ketone.

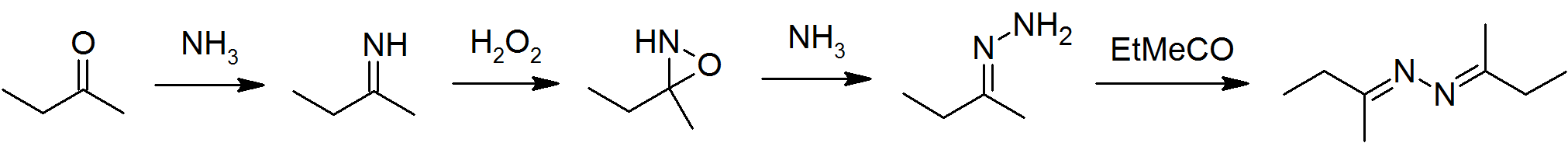

The resulting azine is hydrolyzed to give hydrazine and regenerate the ketone, methyl ethyl ketone:

Me(Et)C=N−N=C(Et)Me + 2 H_{2}O → 2 Me(Et)C=O + N_{2}H_{4}

Unlike most other processes, this approach does not produce a salt as a by-product.

=== Chlorine-based oxidations ===
The Olin Raschig process, first announced in 1907, produces hydrazine from sodium hypochlorite (the active ingredient in many bleaches) and ammonia without the use of a ketone catalyst. This method, used in their Lake Charles plant, relies on the reaction of monochloramine with ammonia to create the N–N single bond as well as a hydrogen chloride byproduct:

NH_{2}Cl + NH_{3} → N_{2}H_{4} + HCl

Related to the Raschig process, urea can be oxidized instead of ammonia. Again sodium hypochlorite serves as the oxidant. The net reaction is shown:

(NH_{2})_{2}CO + NaOCl + 2 NaOH → N_{2}H_{4} + H_{2}O + NaCl + Na_{2}CO_{3}

The process generates significant by-products and is mainly practised in Asia.

The Bayer Ketazine Process is the predecessor to the peroxide process. It employs sodium hypochlorite as oxidant instead of hydrogen peroxide. Like all hypochlorite-based routes, this method produces an equivalent of salt for each equivalent of hydrazine.

== Reactions ==
=== Acid–base behavior ===
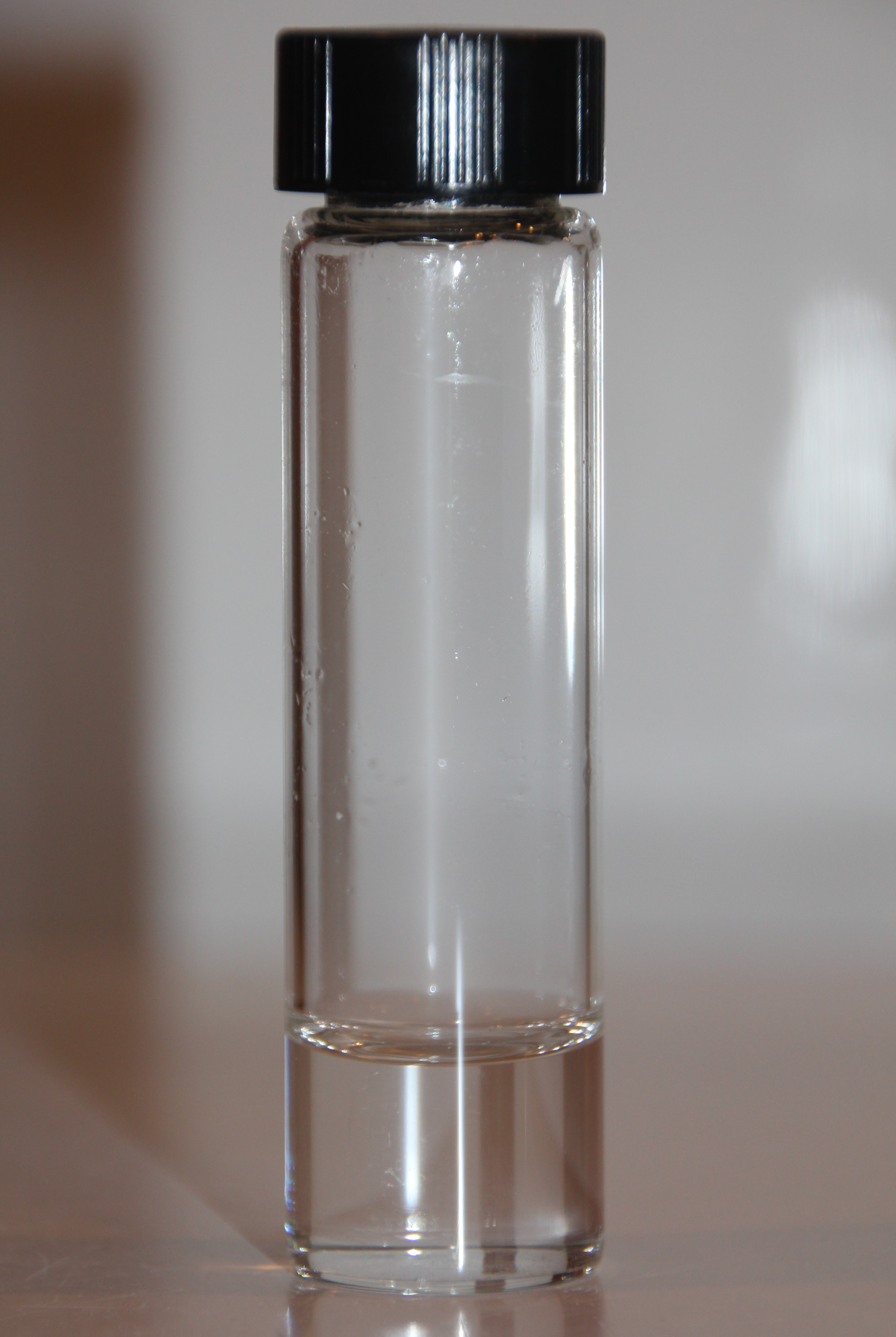
Hydrazine hydrate

Hydrazine forms a monohydrate N_{2}H_{4}·H_{2}O that is denser (1.032 g/cm^{3}) than the anhydrous form N_{2}H_{4} (1.021 g/cm^{3}). Hydrazine has basic (alkali) chemical properties comparable to those of ammonia:

N_{2}H_{4} + H_{2}O → [N_{2}H_{5}]^{+} + OH^{−}, K_{b} = 1.3 × 10^{−6}, pK_{b} = 5.9

(for ammonia K_{b} = 1.78 × 10^{−5}).

It is difficult to diprotonate:

[N_{2}H_{5}]^{+} + H_{2}O → [N_{2}H_{6}]^{2+} + OH^{−}, K_{b} = 8.4 × 10^{−16}, pK_{b} = 15

Exposure to extremely strong bases or alkali metals generates deprotonated hydrazide salts, such as sodium hydrazide. Most explode on exposure to air or moisture.

=== Redox reactions ===
Ideally, the combustion of hydrazine in oxygen produces nitrogen and water:

N_{2}H_{4} + O_{2} → N_{2} + 2 H_{2}O

An excess of oxygen gives oxides of nitrogen, including nitrogen monoxide and nitrogen dioxide:

N_{2}H_{4} + 2 O_{2} → 2 NO + 2 H_{2}O
N_{2}H_{4} + 3 O_{2} → 2 NO_{2} + 2 H_{2}O

The heat of combustion of hydrazine in oxygen (air) is 19.41 MJ/kg (8345 BTU/lb).

Hydrazine is a convenient reductant because the by-products are typically nitrogen gas and water. This property makes it useful as an antioxidant, an oxygen scavenger, and a corrosion inhibitor in water boilers and heating systems. It also directly reduces salts of less active metals (e.g., bismuth, arsenic, copper, mercury, silver, lead, platinum, and palladium) to the element. That property has commercial application in electroless nickel plating and plutonium extraction from nuclear reactor waste. Some colour photographic processes also use a weak solution of hydrazine as a stabilising wash, as it scavenges dye coupler and unreacted silver halides. Hydrazine is the most common and effective reducing agent used to convert graphene oxide (GO) to reduced graphene oxide (rGO) via hydrothermal treatment.

=== Hydrazinium salts ===
Hydrazine can be protonated to form various solid salts of the hydrazinium cation [N_{2}H_{5}]^{+}, by treatment with mineral acids. A common salt is hydrazinium hydrogensulfate, [N_{2}H_{5}]^{+}[HSO_{4}]^{−}. Hydrazinium hydrogensulfate was investigated as a treatment of cancer-induced cachexia, but proved ineffective.

Double protonation gives the hydrazinium dication or hydrazinediium, [N_{2}H_{6}]^{2+}, of which various salts are known.

=== Organic chemistry ===
Hydrazines are part of many organic syntheses, often those of practical significance in pharmaceuticals (see applications section), as well as in textile dyes and in photography.

Hydrazine is used in the Wolff–Kishner reduction, a reaction that transforms the carbonyl group of a ketone into a methylene bridge (or an aldehyde into a methyl group) via a hydrazone intermediate. Upon the catalysis with transition-metals, the hydrazones are used as organometallic reagent equivalents (HOME chemistry) for C-C bond formations. The production of the highly stable dinitrogen from the hydrazine derivative helps to drive the reaction.

Being bifunctional, with two amines, hydrazine is a key building block for the preparation of many heterocyclic compounds via condensation with a range of difunctional electrophiles. With 2,4-pentanedione, it condenses to give the 3,5-dimethylpyrazole. In the Einhorn-Brunner reaction hydrazines react with imides to give triazoles.

Being a good nucleophile, N_{2}H_{4} can attack sulfonyl halides and acyl halides. The tosylhydrazine also forms hydrazones upon treatment with carbonyls.

Hydrazine is used to cleave N-alkylated phthalimide derivatives. This scission reaction allows phthalimide anion to be used as amine precursor in the Gabriel synthesis.

==== Hydrazone formation ====
Illustrative of the condensation of hydrazine with a simple carbonyl is its reaction with acetone to give the acetone azine. The latter reacts further with hydrazine to yield acetone hydrazone:

2 (CH_{3})_{2}CO + N_{2}H_{4} → 2 H_{2}O + ((CH_{3})_{2}C=N)_{2}
((CH_{3})_{2}C=N)_{2} + N_{2}H_{4} → 2 (CH_{3})_{2}C=NNH_{2}

The propanone azine is an intermediate in the Atofina-PCUK process. Direct alkylation of hydrazines with alkyl halides in the presence of base yields alkyl-substituted hydrazines, but the reaction is typically inefficient due to poor control on level of substitution (same as in ordinary amines). The reduction of hydrazones to hydrazines present a clean way to produce 1,1-dialkylated hydrazines.

In a related reaction, 2-cyanopyridines react with hydrazine to form amide hydrazides, which can be converted using 1,2-diketones into triazines.

=== Biochemistry ===
Hydrazine is the intermediate in the anaerobic oxidation of ammonia (anammox) process. It is produced by some yeasts and the open ocean bacterium anammox (Brocadia anammoxidans).

The false morel produces the poison gyromitrin which is an organic derivative of hydrazine that is converted to monomethylhydrazine by metabolic processes. Even the most popular edible "button" mushroom Agaricus bisporus produces organic hydrazine derivatives, including agaritine, a hydrazine derivative of an amino acid, and gyromitrin.

== In popular culture ==
In the sci-fi TV series Salvage 1 the rocketship uses a fictional monopropellant variation of hydrazine -- ”monohydrazine", as its fuel.

In the novel The Martian (which was adapted into a feature film) the main character uses an iridium catalyst to separate hydrogen gas from surplus hydrazine fuel, which he then burns to generate water for survival.

== See also ==
- Nitrous oxide fuel blend – Class of liquid rocket propellants
- USA-193 – U.S. military satellite (2006–2008)
