= Frank Uhlmann =

British biomedical researcher

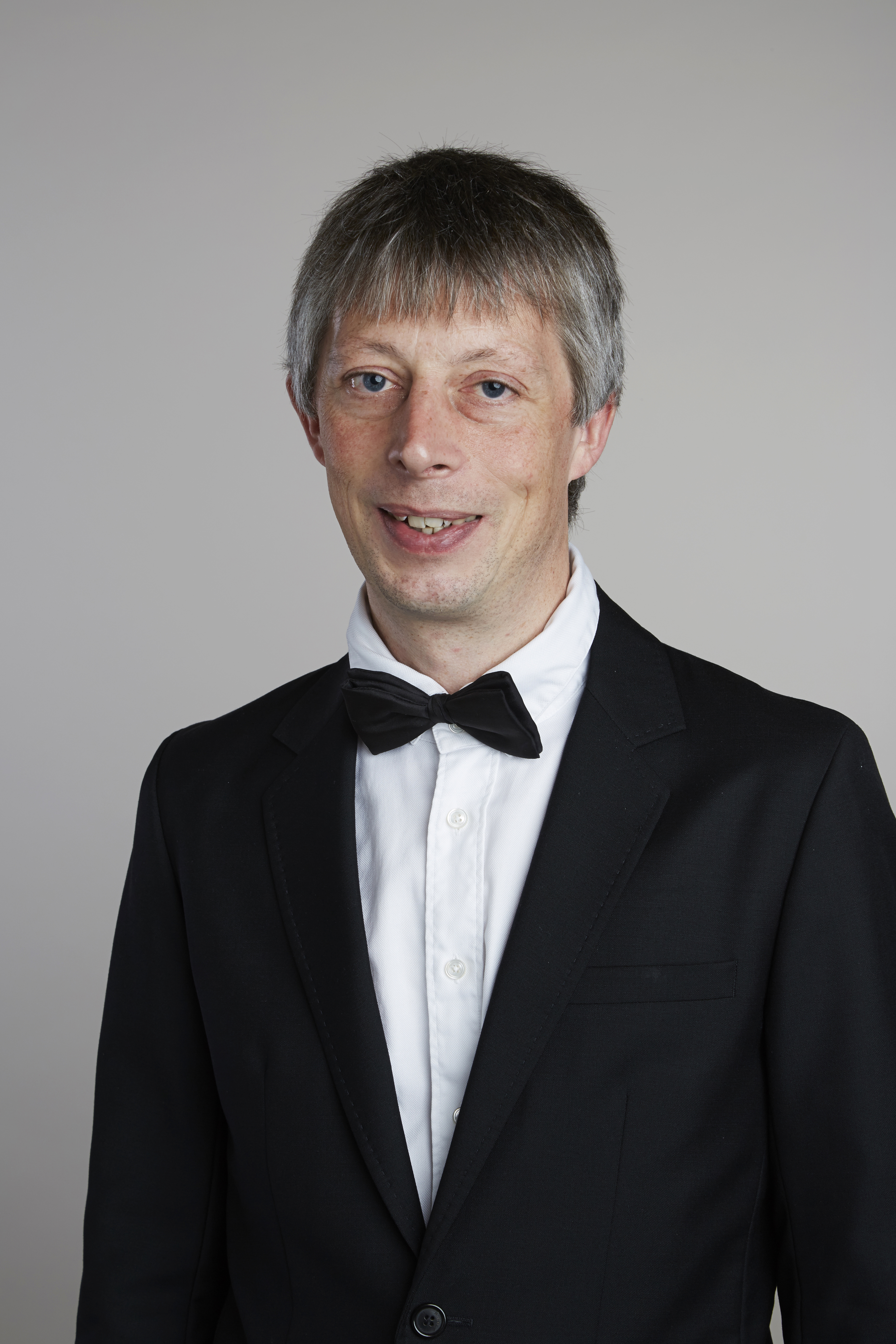
- Frank Uhlmann in 2015, portrait via the Royal Society
- Education: University of Tübingen (PhD)
- Awards: FRS (2015); EMBO member (2006); EMBO Gold Medal (2006)
- Scientific career
- Fields: Cell cycle; Biochemistry; Chromosome segregation
- Workplaces: Francis Crick Institute; Cancer Research UK; London Research Institute; Research Institute of Molecular Pathology
- Thesis: Reconstitution and characterisation of human replication factor C (1997)
- Website: crick.ac.uk/research/a-z-researchers/researchers-t-u/frank-uhlmann

Frank Uhlmann FRS is a group leader at the Francis Crick Institute in London.

== Education ==
Uhlmann was educated at the University of Tübingen where he was awarded a PhD in 1997. During his PhD, he worked with Jerard Hurwitz at the Memorial Sloan Kettering Cancer Center in New York City.

== Career ==
Following his PhD, Uhlmann moved to the Research Institute of Molecular Pathology in Vienna for postdoctoral research with Kim Nasmyth. In 2000, he established a laboratory at the Imperial Cancer Research Fund (now Cancer Research UK) in London, which ultimately became part of the Francis Crick Institute.

== Awards and honours ==
Uhlmann was elected a Fellow of the Royal Society (FRS) in 2015. His certificate of election reads:

Frank Uhlmann's discovery with Nasmyth of 'separase', the protease that cleaves the cohesive links between sister chromatids to trigger anaphase is a key contribution to our understanding of the cell cycle. He has made major contributions to our understanding of the mechanisms of sister chromatid cohesion, and their relationship to cell cycle regulation. He generated the first chromosome-wide high resolution maps of proteins involved in chromosome packaging and segregation. He showed that yeast cohesins accumulate at sites of converging transcription distinct from the sites where their loading factors bind, apparently reflecting interaction with the transcription apparatus; and that cohesin loading factors are recruited to specific chromosomal sites through interaction with the nucleosome remodelling complex Rsc. He has identified genes required for cohesion establishment, and shown that one of these, EcoI, acetylates cohesin during DNA replication, thereby locking it onto DNA and his studies of the link between cohesion regulation and the cell cycle have shown that as well as cleaving cohesin, separase promotes mitotic exit by activating the Cdc14 phosphatase in a protease-independent manner.

In 2006, Uhlmann was also elected a member of the European Molecular Biology Organization (EMBO) and awarded the EMBO Gold Medal.
