= Lysozyme =

Antimicrobial enzyme produced by animals

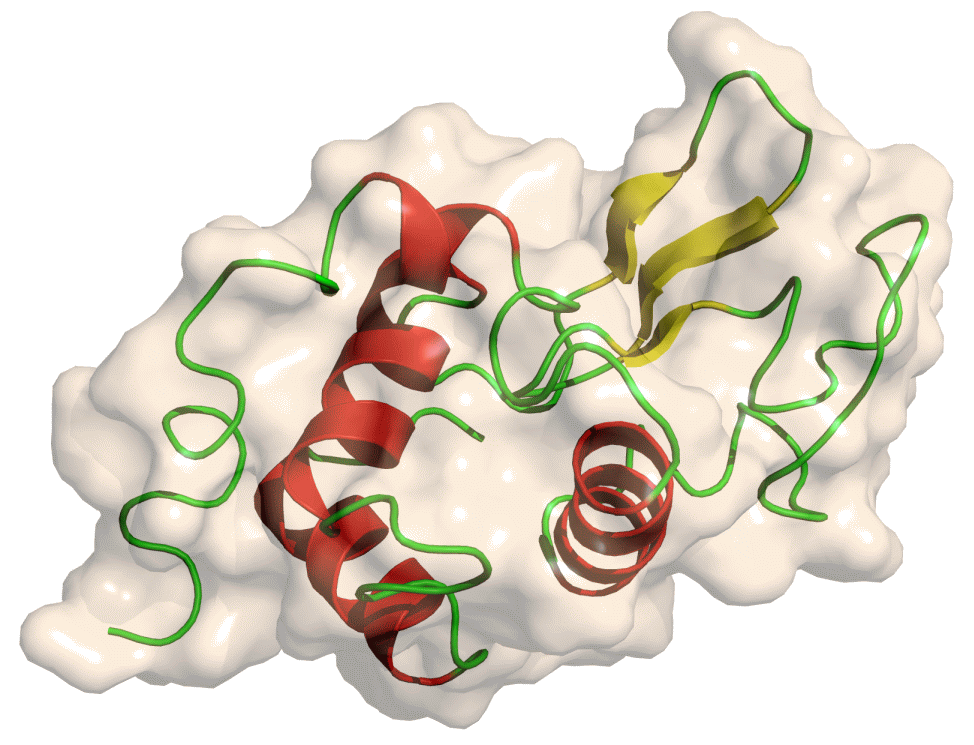

Identifiers
- EC no.: 3.2.1.17
- CAS no.: 9001-63-2

Databases
- BRENDA: enzyme data
- ExPASy: NiceZyme view
- KEGG: enzyme entry
- MetaCyc: metabolic pathway
- Rhea: reactions
- PDB structures: RCSB PDB PDBe PDBsum
- Gene Ontology: AmiGO / QuickGO
Search
- PMC: articles
- PubMed: articles
- NCBI: proteins

Glycoside hydrolase, family 22, lysozyme
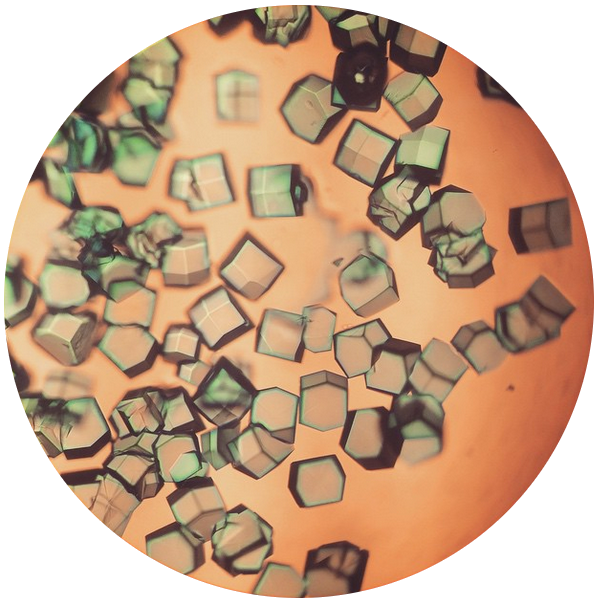
- Lysozyme crystals stained with methylene blue.

Identifiers
- Symbol: ?
- InterPro: IPR000974
Available protein structures:
- PDB: IPR000974
- AlphaFold: IPR000974

Lysozyme (EC 3.2.1.17, muramidase, N-acetylmuramide glycanhydrolase; systematic name peptidoglycan N-acetylmuramoylhydrolase) is an antimicrobial enzyme produced by animals that forms part of the innate immune system.

It is a glycoside hydrolase that catalyzes the following process:

Hydrolysis of (1→4)-β-linkages between N-acetylmuramic acid and N-acetyl-D-glucosamine residues in a peptidoglycan and between N-acetyl-D-glucosamine residues in chitodextrins (dextrins derived from chitin)

Peptidoglycan is the major component of gram-positive bacterial cell wall. This hydrolysis in turn compromises the integrity of bacterial cell walls causing lysis of the bacteria.

Lysozyme is abundant in secretions including tears, saliva, human milk, and mucus. It is also present in cytoplasmic granules of the macrophages and the polymorphonuclear neutrophils (PMNs). Large amounts of lysozyme can be found in egg white. C-type lysozymes are closely related to α-lactalbumin in sequence and structure, making them part of the same glycoside hydrolase family 22. In humans, the C-type lysozyme enzyme is encoded by the LYZ gene.

Hen egg white lysozyme is thermally stable, with a melting point reaching up to 72 °C at pH 5.0. However, lysozyme in human milk loses activity very quickly at that temperature. Hen egg white lysozyme maintains its activity in a large range of pH (6–9). Its isoelectric point is 11.35. The isoelectric point of human milk lysozyme is 10.5–11.

== Function and mechanism ==
The enzyme functions by hydrolyzing glycosidic bonds in peptidoglycans. The enzyme can also break glycosidic bonds in chitin, although not as effectively as true chitinases.

Overview of the reaction catalysed by lysozyme

Lysozyme's active site binds the peptidoglycan molecule in the prominent cleft between its two domains. It attacks peptidoglycans (found in the cell walls of bacteria, especially Gram-positive bacteria), its natural substrate, between N-acetylmuramic acid (NAM) and the fourth carbon atom of N-acetylglucosamine (NAG).

Shorter saccharides like tetrasaccharide have also shown to be viable substrates but via an intermediate with a longer chain. Chitin has also been shown to be a viable lysozyme substrate. Artificial substrates have also been developed and used in lysozyme.

=== Mechanism ===
==== Phillips ====
The Phillips mechanism proposed that the enzyme's catalytic power came from both steric strain on the bound substrate and electrostatic stabilization of an oxo-carbenium intermediate. From X-ray crystallographic data, Phillips proposed the active site of the enzyme, where a hexasaccharide binds. The lysozyme distorts the fourth sugar (in the D or -1 subsite) in the hexasaccharide into a half-chair conformation. In this stressed state, the glycosidic bond is more easily broken. An ionic intermediate containing an oxo-carbenium is created as a result of the glycosidic bond breaking. Thus distortion causing the substrate molecule to adopt a strained conformation similar to that of the transition state will lower the energy barrier of the reaction.

The proposed oxo-carbonium intermediate was speculated to be electrostatically stabilized by aspartate and glutamate residues in the active site by Arieh Warshel in 1978. The electrostatic stabilization argument was based on comparison to bulk water, the reorientation of water dipoles can cancel out the stabilizing energy of charge interaction. In Warshel's model, the enzyme acts as a super-solvent, which fixes the orientation of ion pairs and provides super-solvation (very good stabilization of ion pairs), and especially lower the energy when two ions are close to each other.

The rate-determining step (RDS) in this mechanism is related to formation of the oxo-carbenium intermediate. There were some contradictory results to indicate the exact RDS. By tracing the formation of product (p-nitrophenol), it was discovered that the RDS can change over different temperatures, which was a reason for those contradictory results. At a higher temperature the RDS is formation of glycosyl enzyme intermediate and at a lower temperature the breakdown of that intermediate.

Covalent intermediate of lysozyme enzyme, with covalent bond in black and experimental evidence as blue mesh.

==== Covalent mechanism ====
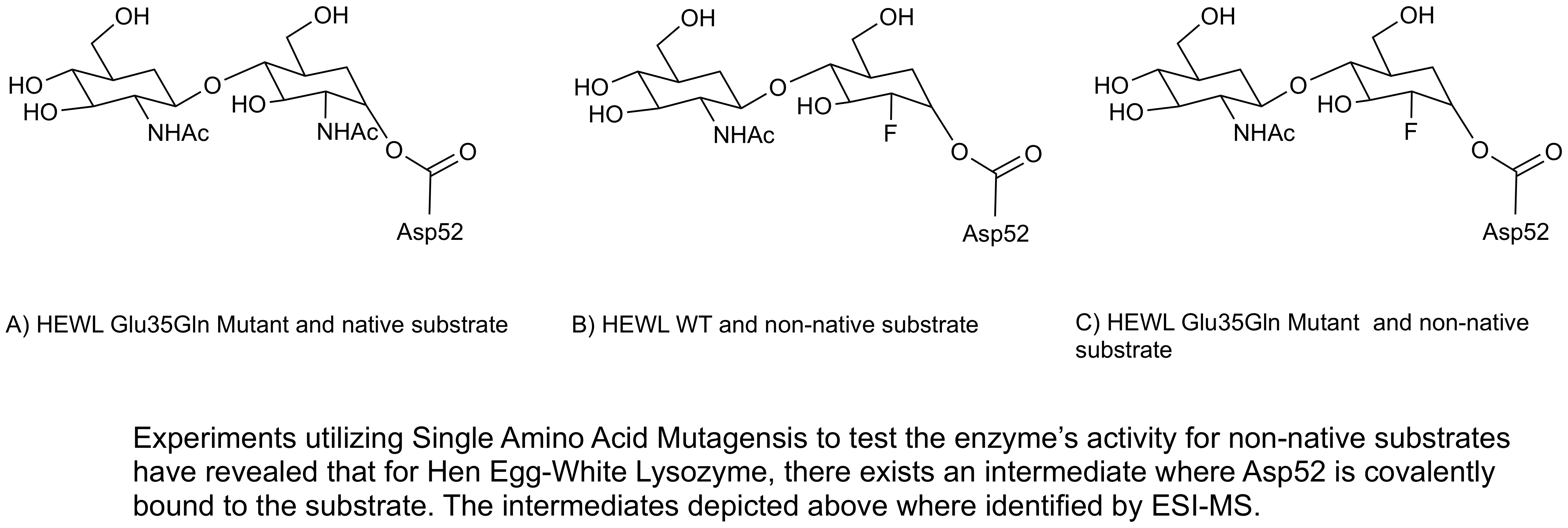
Substrates in Vocadlo's experiment

In an early debate in 1969, Dahlquist proposed a covalent mechanism for lysozyme based on kinetic isotope effect, but for a long time the ionic mechanism was more accepted. In 2001, a revised mechanism was proposed by Vocadlo via a covalent but not ionic intermediate. Evidence from ESI-MS analysis indicated a covalent intermediate. A 2-fluoro substituted substrate was used to lower the reaction rate and accumulate an intermediate for characterization. The amino acid side-chains glutamic acid 35 (Glu35) and aspartate 52 (Asp52) have been found to be critical to the activity of this enzyme. Glu35 acts as a proton donor to the glycosidic bond, cleaving the C-O bond in the substrate, whereas Asp52 acts as a nucleophile to generate a glycosyl enzyme intermediate. The Glu35 reacts with water to form hydroxyl ion, a stronger nucleophile than water, which then attacks the glycosyl enzyme intermediate, to give the product of hydrolysis and leaving the enzyme unchanged. This type of covalent mechanism for enzyme catalysis was first proposed by Koshland.

More recently, quantum mechanics/ molecular mechanics (QM/MM) molecular dynamics simulations have been using the crystal of HEWL and predict the existence of a covalent intermediate. Evidence for the ESI-MS and X-ray structures indicate the existence of covalent intermediate, but primarily rely on using a less active mutant or non-native substrate. Thus, QM/MM molecular dynamics provides the unique ability to directly investigate the mechanism of wild-type HEWL and native substrate. The calculations revealed that the covalent intermediate from the covalent mechanism is ~30 kcal/mol more stable than the ionic intermediate from the Phillips mechanism. These calculations demonstrate that the ionic intermediate is extremely energetically unfavorable and the covalent intermediates observed from experiments using less active mutant or non-native substrates provide useful insight into the mechanism of wild-type HEWL.

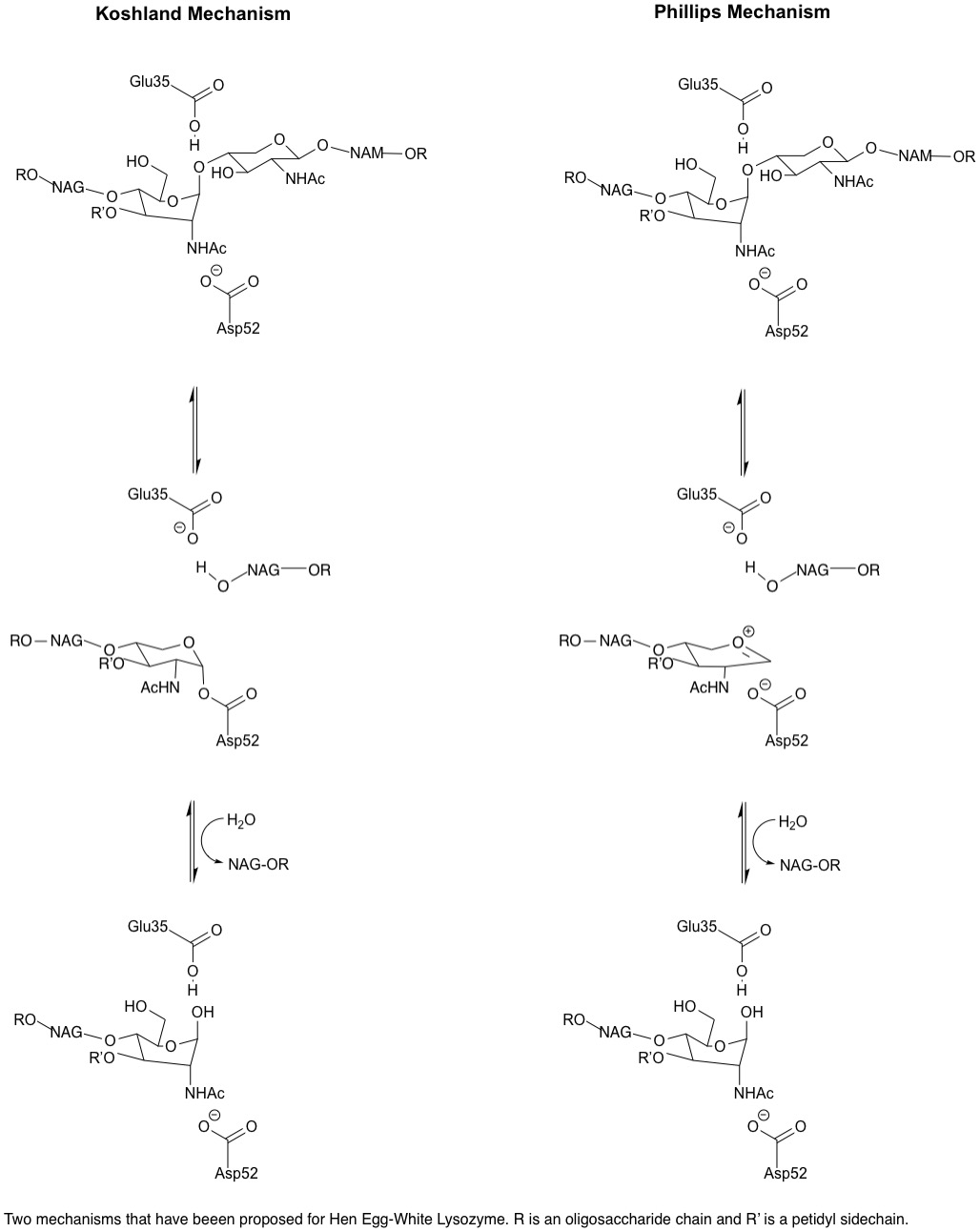
Two Possible Mechanisms of Lysozyme

=== Inhibition ===
Imidazole derivatives can form a charge-transfer complex with some residues (in or outside active center) to achieve a competitive inhibition of lysozyme. In Gram-negative bacteria, the lipopolysaccharide acts as a non-competitive inhibitor by highly favored binding with lysozyme.

=== Non-enzymatic action ===
Despite that the muramidase activity of lysozyme has been supposed to play the key role for its antibacterial properties, evidence of its non-enzymatic action was also reported. For example, blocking the catalytic activity of lysozyme by mutation of critical amino acid in the active site (52-Asp -> 52-Ser) does not eliminate its antimicrobial activity. The lectin-like ability of lysozyme to recognize bacterial carbohydrate antigen without lytic activity was reported for tetrasaccharide related to lipopolysaccharide of Klebsiella pneumoniae. Also, lysozyme interacts with antibodies and T-cell receptors.

=== Enzyme conformation changes ===
Lysozyme exhibits two conformations: an open active state and a closed inactive state. The catalytic relevance was examined with single walled carbon nanotubes (SWCN) field effect transistors (FETs), where a singular lysozyme was bound to the SWCN FET. Electronically monitoring the lysozyme showed two conformations, an open active site and a closed inactive site. In its active state lysozyme is able to processively hydrolyze its substrate, breaking on average 100 bonds at a rate of 15 per second. In order to bind a new substrate and move from the closed inactive state to the open active state requires two conformation step changes, while inactivation requires one step.

=== Superfamily ===
The conventional C-type lysozyme is part of a larger group of structurally and mechanistically related enzymes termed the lysozyme superfamily. This family unites GH22 C-type ("chicken") lysozymes with plant chitinase GH19, G-type ("goose") lysozyme GH23, V-type ("viral") lysozyme GH24 and the chitosanase GH46 families. The lysozyme-type nomenclature only reflects the source a type is originally isolated from and does not fully reflect the taxonomic distribution. For example, humans and many other mammals have two G-type lysozyme genes, LYG1 and LYG2.

== Role in disease and therapy ==
LYZ

Identifiers
- Aliases: LYZ, LZM, LYZF1, lysozyme
- External IDs: OMIM: 153450; MGI: 96902; GeneCards: LYZ
Available structures
PDB	Ortholog search: PDBe RCSB
PDB	List of PDB id codes 133L, 134L, 1B5U, 1B5V, 1B5W, 1B5X, 1B5Y, 1B5Z, 1B7L, 1B7M, 1B7N, 1B7O, 1B7P, 1B7Q, 1B7R, 1B7S, 1BB3, 1BB4, 1BB5, 1C43, 1C45, 1C46, 1C7P, 1CJ6, 1CJ7, 1CJ8, 1CJ9, 1CKC, 1CKD, 1CKF, 1CKG, 1CKH, 1D6P, 1D6Q, 1DI3, 1DI4, 1DI5, 1EQ4, 1EQ5, 1EQE, 1GAY, 1GAZ, 1GB0, 1GB2, 1GB3, 1GB5, 1GB6, 1GB7, 1GB8, 1GB9, 1GBO, 1GBW, 1GBX, 1GBY, 1GBZ, 1GDW, 1GDX, 1GE0, 1GE1, 1GE2, 1GE3, 1GE4, 1GEV, 1GEZ, 1GF0, 1GF3, 1GF4, 1GF5, 1GF6, 1GF7, 1GF8, 1GF9, 1GFA, 1GFE, 1GFG, 1GFH, 1GFJ, 1GFK, 1GFR, 1GFT, 1GFU, 1GFV, 1HNL, 1I1Z, 1I20, 1I22, 1INU, 1IOC, 1IP1, 1IP2, 1IP3, 1IP4, 1IP5, 1IP6, 1IP7, 1IWT, 1IWU, 1IWV, 1IWW, 1IWX, 1IWY, 1IWZ, 1IX0, 1IY3, 1IY4, 1JKA, 1JKB, 1JKC, 1JKD, 1JSF, 1JWR, 1LAA, 1LHH, 1LHI, 1LHJ, 1LHK, 1LHL, 1LHM, 1LMT, 1LOZ, 1LYY, 1LZ1, 1LZ4, 1LZ5, 1LZ6, 1LZR, 1LZS, 1OP9, 1OUA, 1OUB, 1OUC, 1OUD, 1OUE, 1OUF, 1OUG, 1OUH, 1OUI, 1OUJ, 1QSW, 1RE2, 1REM, 1REX, 1REY, 1REZ, 1TAY, 1TBY, 1TCY, 1TDY, 1UBZ, 1W08, 1WQM, 1WQN, 1WQO, 1WQP, 1WQQ, 1WQR, 1YAM, 1YAN, 1YAO, 1YAP, 1YAQ, 207L, 208L, 2BQA, 2BQB, 2BQC, 2BQD, 2BQE, 2BQF, 2BQG, 2BQH, 2BQI, 2BQJ, 2BQK, 2BQL, 2BQM, 2BQN, 2BQO, 2HEA, 2HEB, 2HEC, 2HED, 2HEE, 2HEF, 2LHM, 2MEA, 2MEB, 2MEC, 2MED, 2MEE, 2MEF, 2MEG, 2MEH, 2MEI, 2NWD, 2ZIJ, 2ZIK, 2ZIL, 2ZWB, 3EBA, 3FE0, 3LHM, 3LN2, 4I0C, 4ML7, 4R0P
Enzyme activity
EC #	BRENDA	ExPASy	KEGG	MetaCyc
3.2.1.17	↗	↗	↗	↗

Gene location (Human)
Chr.	Chromosome 12 (human)
Band	12q15	Start	69,348,381 bp
Band	12q15	End	69,354,234 bp

Gene location (Mouse)
Chr.	Chromosome 10 (mouse)
Band	10|10 D2	Start	117,123,702 bp
Band	10|10 D2	End	117,128,773 bp
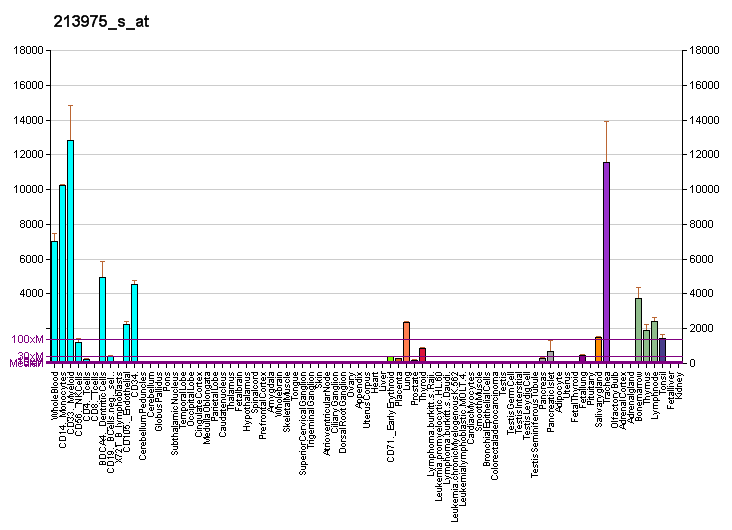
RNA expression pattern
Bgee	Human / Mouse (ortholog); Top expressed in: monocyte; pylorus; granulocyte; trachea; olfactory zone of nasal mucosa; parotid gland; trabecular bone; bone marrow; epithelium of nasopharynx; gallbladder / Top expressed in: ileum; jejunum; duodenum; interventricular septum; bone marrow; lip; white adipose tissue; esophagus; colon; lung; More reference expression data
BioGPS	More reference expression data
Gene ontology
Molecular function	catalytic activity; lysozyme activity; hydrolase activity; hydrolase activity, acting on glycosyl bonds; identical protein binding
Cellular component	extracellular region; extracellular exosome; extracellular space; azurophil granule lumen; specific granule lumen; tertiary granule lumen
Biological process	metabolism; retina homeostasis; inflammatory response; cytolysis; defense response to bacterium; antimicrobial humoral response; neutrophil degranulation; cell wall macromolecule catabolic process; defense response to Gram-negative bacterium; defense response to Gram-positive bacterium
Sources:Amigo / QuickGO
Orthologs
Databases	NCBI: entry; OMA: entry
Species	Human	Mouse
Entrez	4069	17110
Ensembl	ENSG00000090382	ENSMUSG00000069515
UniProt	P61626	P17897
RefSeq (mRNA)	NM_000239	NM_013590
RefSeq (protein)	NP_000230	NP_038618
Location (UCSC)	Chr 12: 69.35 – 69.35 Mb	Chr 10: 117.12 – 117.13 Mb
PubMed search
- Wikidata
View/Edit Human	View/Edit Mouse

Lysozyme is part of the innate immune system. Reduced lysozyme levels have been associated with bronchopulmonary dysplasia in newborns. Piglets fed with human lysozyme milk can recover from diarrheal disease caused by E. coli faster. The concentration of lysozyme in human milk is 1,600 to 3,000 times greater than the concentration in livestock milk. Human lysozyme is more active than hen egg white lysozyme. A transgenic line of goats (with a founder named "Artemis") were developed to produce milk with human lysozyme to protect children from diarrhea if they can't get the benefits of human breastfeeding.

Since lysozyme is a natural form of protection from Gram-positive pathogens like Bacillus and Streptococcus, it plays an important role in immunology of infants in human milk feeding. Whereas the skin is a protective barrier due to its dryness and acidity, the conjunctiva (membrane covering the eye) is, instead, protected by secreted enzymes, mainly lysozyme and defensin. However, when these protective barriers fail, conjunctivitis results.

In certain cancers (especially myelomonocytic leukemia) excessive production of lysozyme by cancer cells can lead to toxic levels of lysozyme in the blood. High lysozyme blood levels can lead to kidney failure and low blood potassium, conditions that may improve or resolve with treatment of the primary malignancy.

Serum lysozyme is much less specific for diagnosis of sarcoidosis than serum angiotensin converting enzyme; however, since it is more sensitive, it is used as a marker of sarcoidosis disease activity and is suitable for disease monitoring in proven cases.

== Chemical synthesis ==
The first chemical synthesis of a lysozyme protein was attempted by Prof. George W. Kenner and his group at the University of Liverpool in England. This was finally achieved in 2007 by Thomas Durek in Steve Kent's lab at the University of Chicago who made a synthetic functional lysozyme molecule.

== Other applications ==
Lysozyme crystals have been used to grow other functional materials for catalysis and biomedical applications. Lysozyme is a commonly used enzyme for lysing gram positive bacteria. Due to the unique function of lysozyme in which it can digest the cell wall and cause osmotic shock (burst the cell by suddenly changing solute concentration around the cell and thus the osmotic pressure), lysozyme is commonly used in lab setting to release proteins from bacterium periplasm while the inner membrane remains sealed as vesicles called the spheroplast.

For example, E. coli can be lysed using lysozyme to free the contents of the periplasmic space. It is especially useful in lab setting for trying to collect the contents of the periplasm. Lysozyme treatment is optimal at particular temperatures, pH ranges, and salt concentrations. Lysozyme activity increases with increasing temperatures, up to 60 degrees Celsius, with a pH range of 6.0-7.0. The salts present also affect lysozyme treatment, where some assert inhibitory effects, and others promote lysis via lysozyme treatment. Sodium chloride induces lysis, but at high concentrations, it is an active inhibitor of lysis. Similar observations have been seen with the use of potassium salts. Slight variations are present due to differences in bacterial strains. A consequence of the use of lysozyme in extracting recombinant proteins for protein crystallization is that the crystal may be contaminated with units of lysozyme, producing a physiologically irrelevant combination. In fact, some proteins simply cannot crystalize without such contamination.

Furthermore, lysozyme can serve as a tool in the expression of toxic recombinant proteins. Expressing recombinant proteins in BL21(DE3) strains is typically accomplished by the T7-RNA-polymerase. Via IPTG induction, the UV-5 repressor is inhibited, leading to the transcription of the T7-RNA-polymerase and thereby of the protein of interest. Nonetheless, a basal level of the T7-RNA-polymerase is observable even without induction. T7 lysozyme acts as an inhibitor of the T7-RNA-polymerase. Newly invented strains, containing a helper plasmid (pLysS), constitutively co-express low levels of T7 lysozyme, providing high stringency and consistent expression of the toxic recombinant protein.

== History ==
The antibacterial property of hen egg white, due to the lysozyme it contains, was first observed by Laschtschenko in 1909. The bacteria-killing activity of nasal mucus was demonstrated in 1922 by Alexander Fleming, the discoverer of penicillin, who coined the term "lysozyme". He is reported as saying: "As this substance has properties akin to those of ferments I have called it a 'Lysozyme'." Fleming went on to show that an enzymic substance was present in a wide variety of secretions and was capable of rapidly lysing (i.e. dissolving) different bacteria, particularly a yellow "coccus" that he studied".

Lysozyme was first crystallised by Edward Abraham in 1937, enabling the three-dimensional structure of hen egg white lysozyme to be described by David Chilton Phillips in 1965, when he obtained the first 2-ångström (200 pm) resolution model via X-ray crystallography. The structure was publicly presented at a Royal Institution Friday Evening Discourse in 1965. Lysozyme was the second protein structure and the first enzyme structure to be solved via X-ray diffraction methods, and the first enzyme to be fully sequenced that contains all twenty common amino acids. As a result of Phillips' elucidation of the structure of lysozyme, it was also the first enzyme to have a detailed, specific mechanism suggested for its method of catalytic action. This work led Phillips to provide an explanation for how enzymes speed up a chemical reaction in terms of its physical structures. The original mechanism proposed by Phillips was more recently revised.

== See also ==
- Egg allergy
