= Streptomyces thermoviolaceus =

Scientific classification
- Domain: Bacteria
- Kingdom: Bacillati
- Phylum: Actinomycetota
- Class: Actinomycetes
- Order: Streptomycetales
- Family: Streptomycetaceae
- Genus: Streptomyces
- Species: S. thermoviolaceus

Binomial name
- Streptomyces thermoviolaceus Henssen 1957

Type strain
- AS 4.1471, ATCC 19283, BCRC 12493, BCRC 12639, CBS 278.66, CBS 688.66, CBS 688.72, CCRC 12493, CCRC 12639, CGMCC 4.1471, DSM 40443, ETH 25785, HAMBI 1006, Henssen MB R77, Henssen R77, HUT-6604, IFO 1238, IFO 13387, IFO 13905, IMET 4335, ISP 5443, JCM 4239, JCM 4337, JCM 4843, KCC S-0337, KCC S-0843, KCCS-0843, KCTC 19948, Lanoot R-8724, LMG 14943, LMG 19359, MB R77, NBRC 12382, NBRC 13387, NBRC 13905, NCIB 10076, NCIMB 10076, NRRL B-12374, NRRL-ISP 5443, R-77, R-8724, RIA 1348, VKM Ac-1857, VTT E-991428

Subspecies
- Streptomyces thermoviolaceus subsp. apingens Streptomyces thermoviolaceus subsp. thermoviolaceus

Species of bacterium

Streptomyces thermoviolaceus is a thermophilic bacterium species from the genus of Streptomyces which has been isolated from composts. Streptomyces thermoviolaceus produces chitinase and peroxidase.

== See also ==
- List of Streptomyces species
