= Streptomyces lunalinharesii =

Scientific classification
- Domain: Bacteria
- Kingdom: Bacillati
- Phylum: Actinomycetota
- Class: Actinomycetes
- Order: Streptomycetales
- Family: Streptomycetaceae
- Genus: Streptomyces
- Species: S. lunalinharesii

Binomial name
- Streptomyces lunalinharesii de Souza et al. 2008

Type strain
- ATCC BAA-1231, CIP 108852, DSM 41876, JCM 16374, RC1071, RCQ1071

Species of bacterium

Streptomyces lunalinharesii is a chitinolytic bacterium species from the genus of Streptomyces which has been isolated from soil in Brazil.

== See also ==
- List of Streptomyces species
