= Streptomyces kurssanovii =

Scientific classification
- Domain: Bacteria
- Kingdom: Bacillati
- Phylum: Actinomycetota
- Class: Actinomycetes
- Order: Streptomycetales
- Family: Streptomycetaceae
- Genus: Streptomyces
- Species: S. kurssanovii

Binomial name
- Streptomyces kurssanovii (Preobrazhenskaya et al. 1957) Pridham et al. 1958 (Approved Lists 1980)

Type strain
- ATCC 15824, ATCC 19774, ATCC 23629, BCRC 12133, CBS 213.62, CBS 512.68, CCRC 12133, CECT 3274, CEST 3274, CGMCC 4.1889, DSM 40162, ETH 28492, IFO 13192, INA 10294, ISP 5162, JCM 4388, KCC S-0388, KCCS-0388, KCTC 9876, NBRC 13192, NCIMB 12787, NCIMB 12788, NRRL B-3366, NRRL-ISP 5162, Preobrazhenskaya 10294, RIA 1054, UNIQEM 160

Synonyms
- "Actinomyces kurssanovii" Preobrazhenskaya et al. 1957

Species of bacterium

Streptomyces kurssanovii is a bacterium species from the genus of Streptomyces which has been isolated from soil in Russia. Streptomyces kurssanovii produces chitinase, N-(Phenylacetyl)-2-butenediamide and fumaramidmycin.

== See also ==
- List of Streptomyces species
