= Glycoside hydrolase family 24 =

Family of glycoside hydrolases

Phage lysozyme
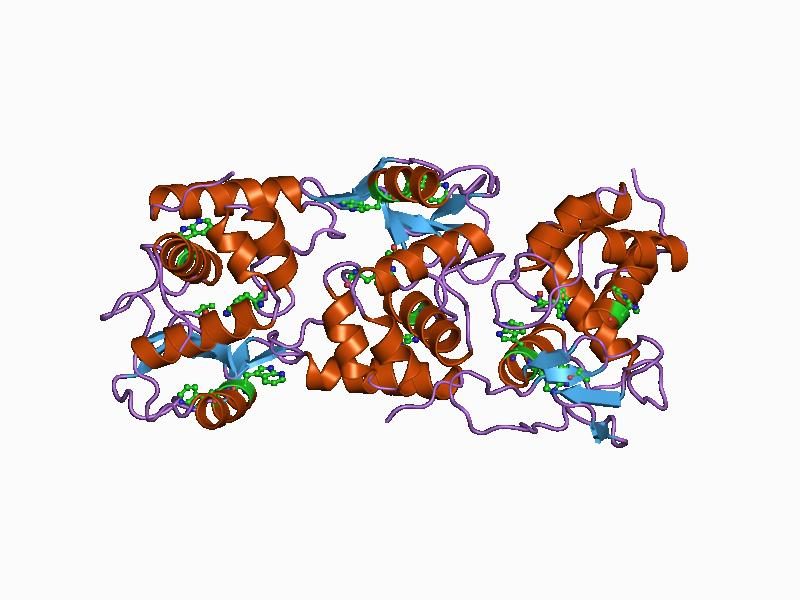
- lysozyme from bacteriophage lambda

Identifiers
- Symbol: Phage_lysozyme
- Pfam: PF00959
- Pfam clan: CL0037
- InterPro: IPR002196
- SCOP2: 119l / SCOPe / SUPFAM
- CAZy: GH24
- CDD: cd00442
Available protein structures:
- PDB: IPR002196 PF00959 (ECOD; PDBsum)
- AlphaFold: IPR002196; PF00959

In molecular biology, glycoside hydrolase family 24 is a family of glycoside hydrolases.

Glycoside hydrolases EC 3.2.1. are a widespread group of enzymes that hydrolyse the glycosidic bond between two or more carbohydrates, or between a carbohydrate and a non-carbohydrate moiety. A classification system for glycoside hydrolases, based on sequence similarity, has led to the definition of >100 different families. This classification is available on the CAZy web site, and also discussed at CAZypedia, an online encyclopedia of carbohydrate active enzymes.

Glycoside hydrolase family 24 CAZY GH_24 comprises enzymes with only one known activity; lysozyme (EC 3.2.1.17). This family includes lambda phage lysozyme and Escherichia coli T4 phage endolysin. Lysozyme helps to release mature phage particles from the cell wall by breaking down the peptidoglycan. The enzyme hydrolyses the 1,4-beta linkages between N-acetyl-D-glucosamine and N-acetylmuramic acid in peptidoglycan heteropolymers of prokaryotic cell walls. E. coli endolysin also functions in bacterial cell lysis and acts as a transglycosylase. The T4 lysozyme structure contains 2 domains, the interface between which forms the active-site cleft. The N-terminus of the 2 domains undergoes a 'hinge-bending' motion about an axis passing through the molecular waist. This mobility is thought to be important in allowing access of substrates to the enzyme active site.
