= LYG1 =

Protein-coding gene in humans

Identifiers
- Aliases: LYG1, SALW1939, lysozyme g1, LYGA1
- External IDs: MGI: 1916791; GeneCards: LYG1

Gene location (Human)
Chr.	Chromosome 2 (human)
Band	2q11.2	Start	99,284,238 bp
Band	2q11.2	End	99,304,742 bp

Gene location (Mouse)
Chr.	Chromosome 1 (mouse)
Band	1|1 B	Start	37,985,817 bp
Band	1|1 B	End	37,996,840 bp
RNA expression pattern
Bgee	Human / Mouse (ortholog); Top expressed in: human kidney; testicle; granulocyte; right lobe of liver; cerebellar hemisphere; mucosa of transverse colon; right hemisphere of cerebellum; spleen; right testis; apex of heart / Top expressed in: tongue; esophagus; lip; zygote; foregut; stomach; cerebellar cortex; More reference expression data
BioGPS	n/a
Gene ontology
Molecular function	hydrolase activity; lysozyme activity; hydrolase activity, acting on glycosyl bonds
Cellular component	extracellular region
Biological process	cell wall macromolecule catabolic process; metabolism; peptidoglycan catabolic process
Sources:Amigo / QuickGO
Orthologs
Databases	NCBI: entry; OMA: entry
Species	Human	Mouse
Entrez	129530	69541
Ensembl	ENSG00000144214	ENSMUSG00000026085
UniProt	Q8N1E2	Q9D7Q0
RefSeq (mRNA)	NM_174898; NM_001371380	NM_027111
RefSeq (protein)	NP_777558; NP_001358309	NP_081387
Location (UCSC)	Chr 2: 99.28 – 99.3 Mb	Chr 1: 37.99 – 38 Mb
PubMed search
- Wikidata
View/Edit Human	View/Edit Mouse

Lysozyme G1 is a protein that in humans is encoded by the LYG1 gene. LYG1 is a goose-type lysozyme that hydrolyzes bacterial peptidoglycan, and may be involved in mediating immune defense responses to Gram-positive bacteria.
