= Glycoside hydrolase family 22 =

Family of glycoside hydrolases

In molecular biology, glycoside hydrolase family 22 is a family of glycoside hydrolases. EC 3.2.1., which are a widespread group of enzymes that hydrolyse the glycosidic bond between two or more carbohydrates, or between a carbohydrate and a non-carbohydrate moiety. A classification system for glycoside hydrolases, based on sequence similarity, has led to the definition of >100 different families. This classification is available on the CAZy web site, and also discussed at CAZypedia, an online encyclopedia of carbohydrate active enzymes.

Glycoside hydrolase family 22 CAZY GH_22 comprises lysozyme type C (EC 3.2.1.17) lysozyme type i (EC 3.2.1.17) and alpha-lactalbumins. Asp and/or the carbonyl oxygen of the C-2 acetamido group of the substrate acts as the catalytic nucleophile/base.

Alpha-lactalbumin, is a milk protein that acts as the regulatory subunit of lactose synthetase, acting to promote the conversion of galactosyltransferase to lactose synthase, which is essential for milk production. In the mammary gland, alpha-lactalbumin changes the substrate specificity of galactosyltransferase from N-acetylglucosamine to glucose.

Lysozymes act as bacteriolytic enzymes by hydrolyzing the beta(1->4) bonds between N-acetylglucosamine and N-acetylmuramic acid in the peptidoglycan of bacterial cell walls. It has also been recruited for a digestive role in certain ruminants and colobine monkeys. There are at least five different classes of lysozymes: C (chicken type), G (goose type), phage-type (T4), fungi (Chalaropsis), and bacterial (Bacillus subtilis). There are few similarities in the sequences of the different types of lysozymes.

Lysozyme type C and alpha-lactalbumin are similar both in terms of primary sequence and structure, and probably evolved from a common ancestral protein. Around 35 to 40% of the residues are conserved in both proteins as well as the positions of the four disulphide bonds. There is, however, no similarity in function. Another significant difference between the two enzymes is that all lactalbumins have the ability to bind calcium, while this property is restricted to only a few lysozymes.

The binding site was deduced using high resolution X-ray structure analysis and was shown to consist of three aspartic acid residues. It was first suggested that calcium bound to lactalbumin stabilised the structure, but recently it has been claimed that calcium controls the release of lactalbumin from the golgi membrane and that the pattern of ion binding may also affect the catalytic properties of the lactose synthetase complex.
