= Securin =

Type of protein

Securin is a protein involved in control of the metaphase-anaphase transition and anaphase onset. Following bi-orientation of chromosome pairs and inactivation of the spindle checkpoint system, the underlying regulatory system, which includes securin, produces an abrupt stimulus that induces highly synchronous chromosome separation in anaphase. Securin binds to and inhibits separase, a protease that degrades the cohesin rings linking sister chromatids. To initiate anaphase, securin is targeted for degradation, which releases separase to destroy cohesin and initiate chromosome separation.

== Securin and Separase ==
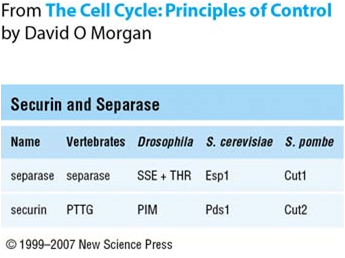
Figure 1: Securin and separase are widely conserved

Securin is initially present in the cytoplasm and binds to separase, a protease that degrades the cohesin rings that link the two sister chromatids. Separase is vital for onset of anaphase. This securin-separase complex is maintained when securin is phosphorylated by Cdk1, inhibiting ubiquitination. When bound to securin, separase is not functional.

In addition, both securin and separase are well conserved proteins (Figure 1). Note that separase cannot function without initially forming the securin-separase complex. This is because securin helps properly fold separase into the functional conformation. However, yeast does not appear to require securin to form functional separase as anaphase occurs in yeast with a securin deletion mutation.

== Role of Securin in the onset of Anaphase ==
=== Basic mechanism ===
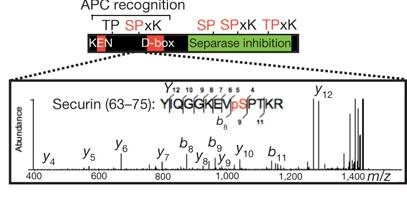
Figure 2: Five identified phosphorylation sites on securin

Securin has five known phosphorylation sites that are targets of Cdk1; two sites at the N-terminal in the Ken-Box and D-box region are known to affect APC recognition and ubiquitination (Figure 2). To initiate the onset of anaphase, securin is dephosphorylated by Cdc14 and other phosphatases. Dephosphorylated securin is recognized by the Anaphase-Promoting Complex (APC) bound primarily to Cdc20 (Cdh1 is also an activating substrate of APC). The APC^{Cdc20} complex ubiquitinates securin and targets it for degradation by 26S proteasome. This results in free separase that is able to destroy cohesin and initiate chromosome separation.

=== Network characteristics ===
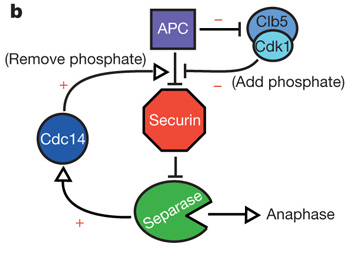
Figure 3: Network diagram with feedback loops to generate switch-like activation of anaphase

It is thought that securin integrates multiple regulatory inputs to make separase activation switch like, resulting in sudden, coordinated anaphase. This likely involves a network with several feedback loops, including positive feedback which leads to switch-like behavior. One proposed signaling pathway generating switch-like behavior contains a positive feedback loop for activation of Cdc14 by separase, leading to dephosphorylation and degradation of securin (Figure 3).

David Morgan’s group found that segregation time of chromosomes 4 and 5 is significantly elongated in budding-yeast strains with mutations in the 2 N-terminal securin phosphorylation sites and securin deletion strains. In addition, these mutant strains exhibited very high rates of mis-segregation compared to normal behavior. Switch like characteristics are necessary to trigger quick, coordinated chromosomal segregation in anaphase. This means that strong inactivation of separase by securin followed by sudden, rapid destruction of securin and activation of separase is vital for proper anaphase.

Overall, securin and separase act in an anaphase-regulating network. Figure 4 depicts a potential network diagram.

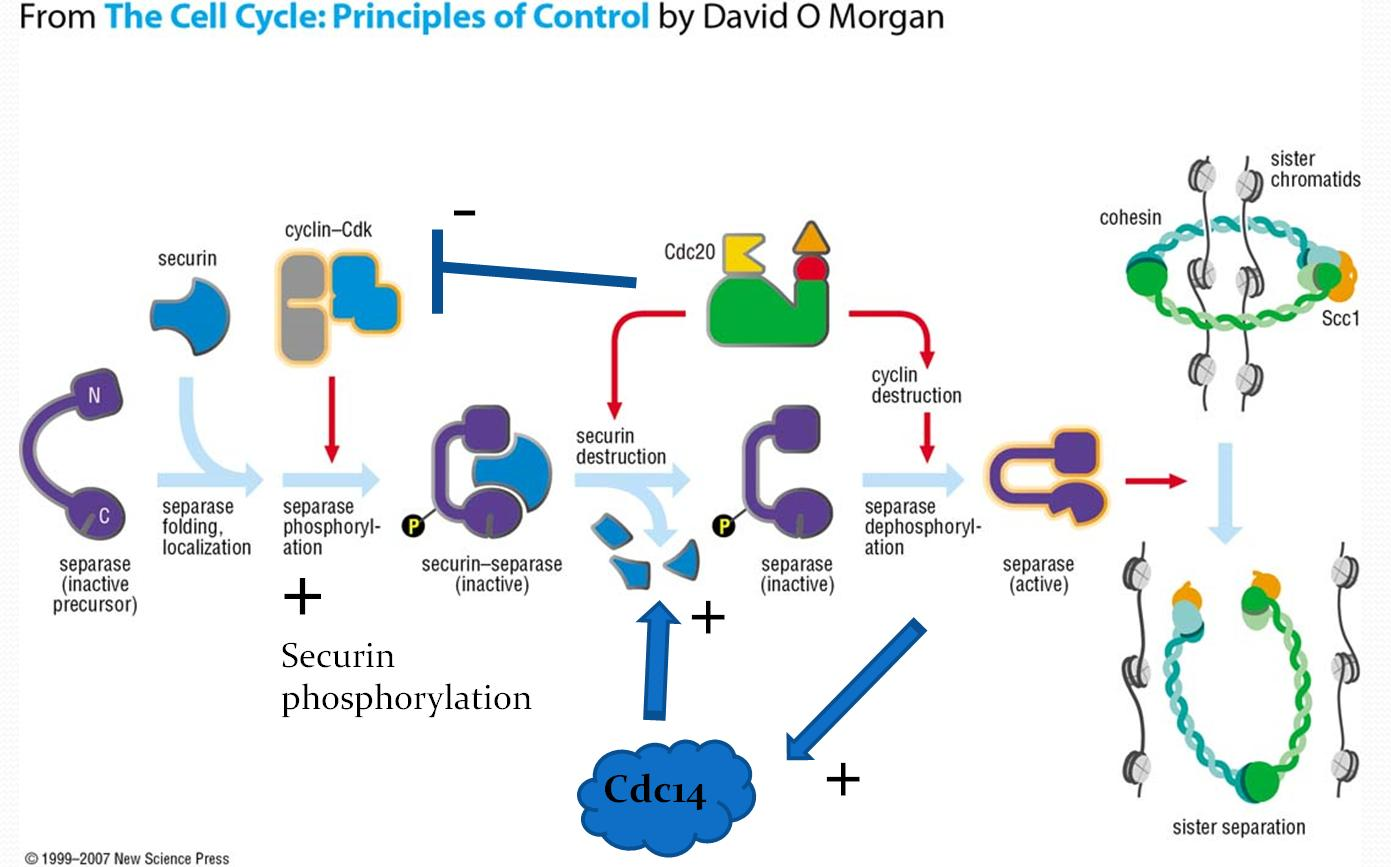
Figure 4: Potential network diagram involving securin to generate switch-like activation of anaphase
