= Chitinase =

Enzymes which degrade or break chitin

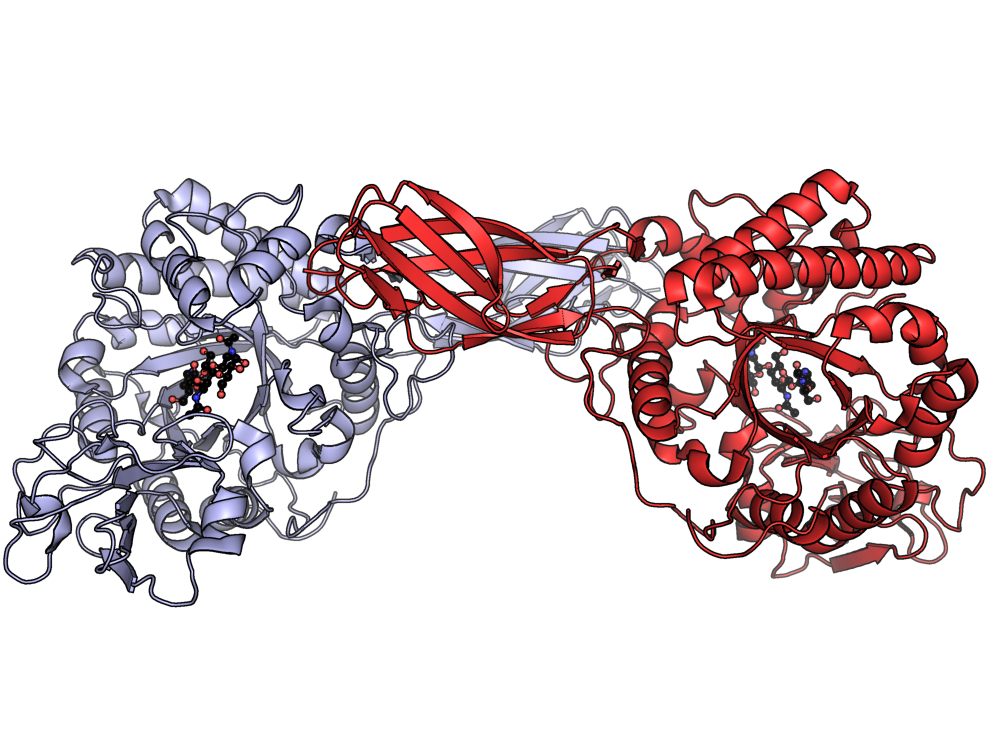
- Serratia marcescens chitinase A dimer with bound inhibitor allosamidin. PDB: 1FFQ

Identifiers
- EC no.: 3.2.1.14

Databases
- BRENDA: enzyme data
- ExPASy: NiceZyme view
- KEGG: enzyme entry
- MetaCyc: metabolic pathway
- Rhea: reactions
- PDB structures: RCSB PDB PDBe PDBsum
Search
- PMC: articles
- PubMed: articles
- NCBI: proteins

Chitinases (EC 3.2.1.14) are hydrolytic enzymes that break down glycosidic bonds in chitin. They catalyse the following reaction:

Random endo-hydrolysis of N-acetyl-β-D-glucosaminide (1→4)-β-linkages in chitin and chitodextrins

As chitin is a component of the cell walls of fungi and exoskeletal elements of some animals (including mollusks and arthropods), chitinases are generally found in organisms that either need to reshape their own chitin or dissolve and digest the chitin of fungi or animals.

== Nomenclature ==
Chitinase has the systematic name (1→4)-2-acetamido-2-deoxy-β-D-glucan glycanohydrolase. It is also known as:

- chitodextrinase
- 1,4-β-poly-N-acetylglucosaminidase
- poly-β-glucosaminidase
- β-1,4-poly-N-acetyl glucosamidinase
- poly[1,4-(N-acetyl-β-D-glucosaminide)] glycanohydrolase
- (1→4)-2-acetamido-2-deoxy-β-D-glucan glycanohydrolase

== Species distribution ==
Chitinivorous organisms include many bacteria (Aeromonads, Bacillus, Vibrio, among others), which may be pathogenic or detritivorous. They attack living arthropods, zooplankton or fungi or they may degrade the remains of these organisms.

Fungi, such as Coccidioides immitis, also possess degradative chitinases related to their role as detritivores and also to their potential as arthropod pathogens.

Chitinases are also present in plants – for example barley seed chitinase: PDB: 1CNS, EC 3.2.1.14. Barley seeds are found to produce clone 10 in Ignatius et al 1994(a). They find clone 10, a Class I chitinase, in the seed aleurone during development. Leaves produce several isozymes (as well as several of β-1,3-glucanase). Ignatius et al 1994(b) find these in the leaves, induced by powdery mildew. Ignatius et al also find these (seed and leaf isozymes) to differ from each other. Some of these are pathogenesis related (PR) proteins that are induced as part of systemic acquired resistance. Expression is mediated by the NPR1 gene and the salicylic acid pathway, both involved in resistance to fungal and insect attack. Other plant chitinases may be required for creating fungal symbioses.

Although mammals do not produce chitin, they have two functional chitinases, chitotriosidase (CHIT1) and acidic mammalian chitinase (CHIA/AMCase). They also have chitinase-like proteins (such as CHI3L1/YKL-40) that have high sequence similarity but lack chitinase activity.

== Classification ==
=== Activity ===
- Endochitinases (EC 3.2.1.14) randomly split chitin at internal sites of the chitin microfibril, forming soluble, low molecular mass multimer products. The multimer products includes di-acetylchitobiose, chitotriose, and chitotetraose, with the dimer being the predominant product.
- Exochitinases have also been divided into two sub categories:
  - Chitobiosidases (EC 3.2.1.29) act on the non-reducing end of the chitin microfibril, releasing the dimer, di-acetylchitobiose, one by one from the chitin chain. Therefore, there is no release of monosaccharides or oligosaccharides in this reaction.
  - β-1,4- N-acetylglucosaminidases (EC 3.2.1.30) split the multimer products, such as di-acetylchitobiose, chitotriose, and chitotetraose, into monomers of N-acetylglucoseamine (GlcNAc).

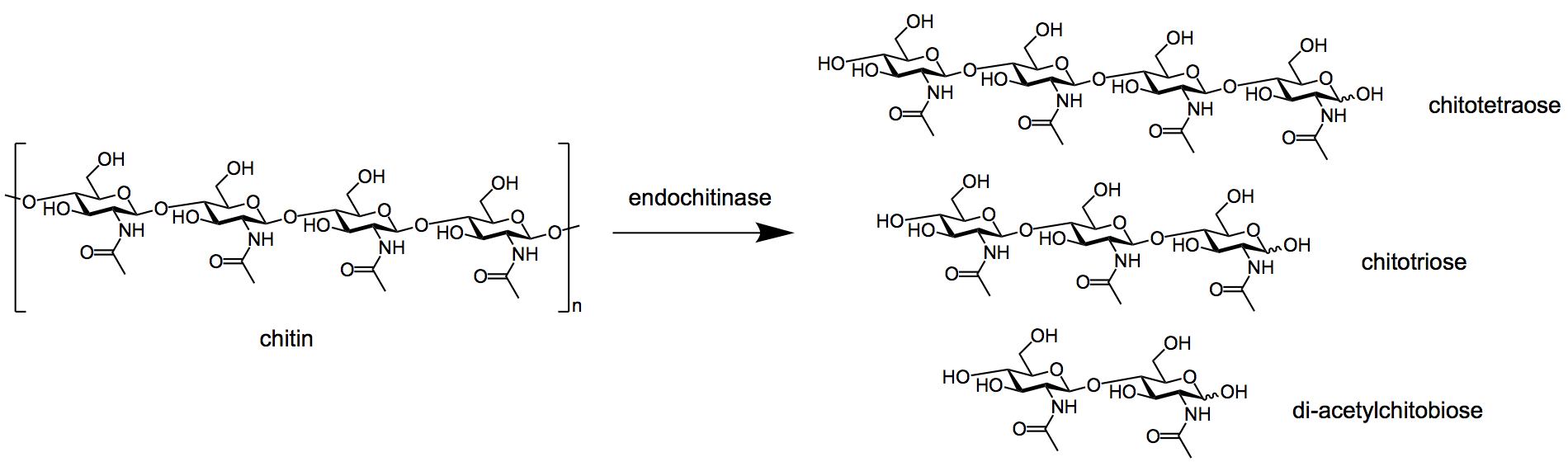
Endochitinase breaking down chitin into multimer products.

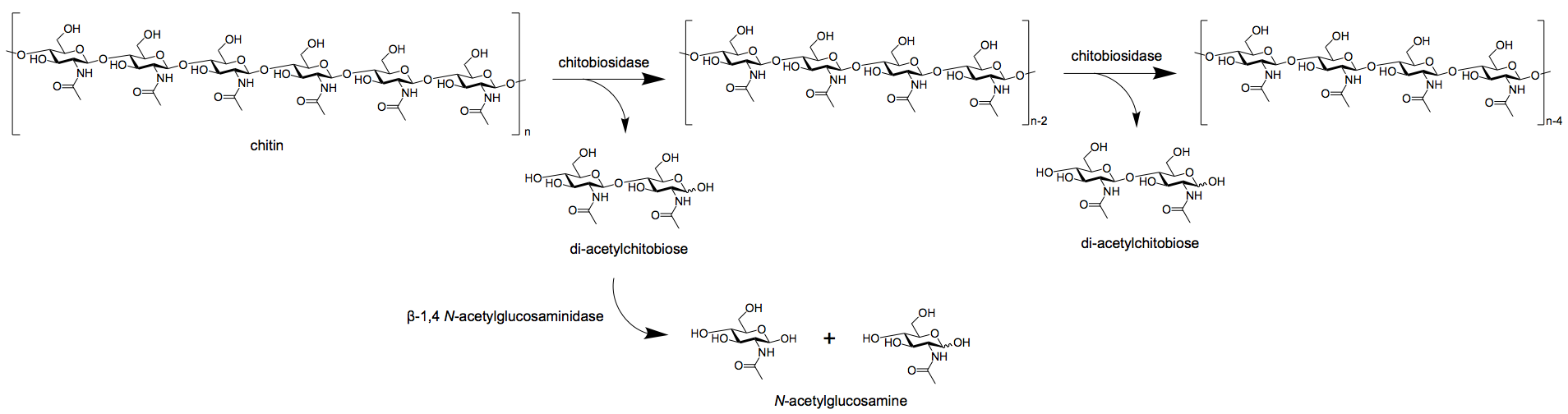
Exochitinase breaking down chitin into dimers via chitobiosidase and monomers via β-1,4-N-acetylglucosaminidase.

=== Evolutionary ===
Chitinases were also classified based on the amino acid sequences, as that would be more helpful in understanding the evolutionary relationships of these enzymes to each other. Therefore, the chitinases were grouped into three families: 18, 19, and 20. Both families 18 and 19 consists of endochitinases from a variety of different organisms, including viruses, bacteria, fungi, insect, and plants. However, family 19 mainly comprises plant chitinases. Family 20 includes N-acetylglucosaminidase and a similar enzyme, N-acetylhexosaminidase.

=== Plant classes ===
Plant chitinases were classified into six classes based on their sequences and domain organization. Characteristics that determined the classes of chitinases were the N-terminal sequence, localization of the enzyme, isoelectric pH, signal peptide, and inducers.

Class I chitinases (GH19) had a cysteine-rich N-terminal, leucine- or valine-rich signal peptide, and vacuolar localization. They are basic proteins and can be divided into IL and IH (low and high molecular weight). IL can be further divided into Class Ia and Class Ib by whether a C-terminal extension is present.

Class II chitinases (GH19) did not have the cysteine-rich N-terminal but had a similar sequence to Class I chitinases. Class II mostly consisted of exochitinases. Similar enzymes also occur in fungi and bacteria. They are acidic.

Class III chitinases (GH18) did not have similar sequences to chitinases in Class I or Class II. They may be acidic or basic. IIIa has a signal peptide while IIIb does not.

Class IV chitinases (GH19) had similar characteristics, including the immunological properties, as Class I chitinases. They are basic. However, Class IV chitinases were significantly smaller in size compared to Class I chitinases.

Class V chitinases (GH18) are not well characterized. However, one example of a Class V chitinase showed two chitin binding domains in tandem, and based on the gene sequence, the cysteine-rich N-terminal seemed to have been lost during evolution, probably due to less selection pressure that caused the catalytic domain to lose its function.

Class VI (GH19) chitinases are basic while Class VII (GH19) ones are slightly basic.

In the pathogenesis-related protein (PR) nomenclature, GH19 chitinases are classified as PR-3. Class III are classified as PR-8 and class V are classified as PR-11.

== Isozymes found in humans ==
chitinase, acidic
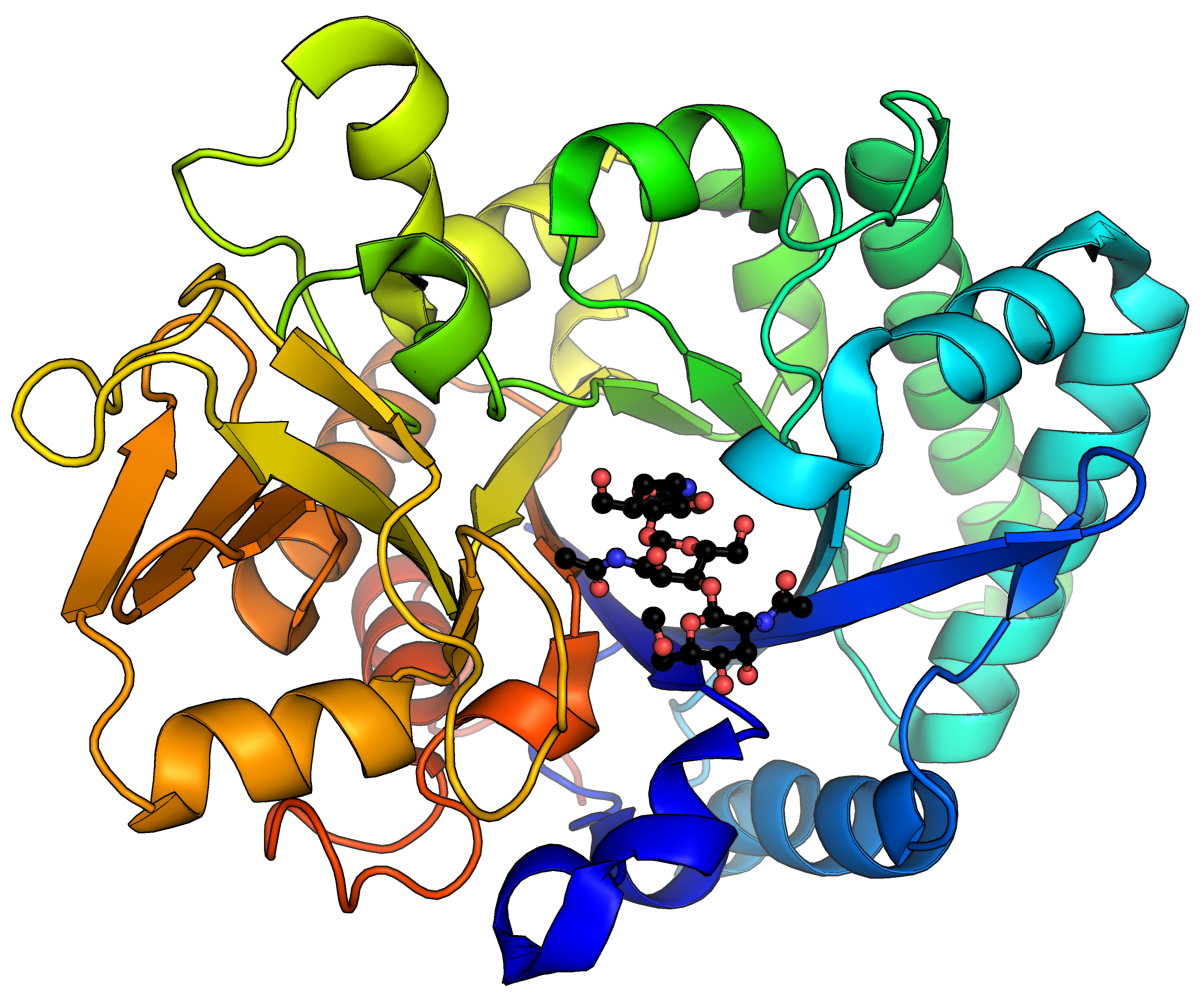
- Homo sapiens acidic mammalian chitinase with bound inhibitor methylallosamidin. PDB: 3FY1

Identifiers
- Symbol: CHIA
- NCBI gene: 27159
- HGNC: 17432
- OMIM: 606080
- RefSeq: NM_001040623
- UniProt: Q9BZP6

Other data
- EC number: 3.2.1.14
- Locus: Chr. 1 p13.1-21.3
Search for
- Structures: Swiss-model
- Domains: InterPro

chitinase 1 (chitotriosidase)
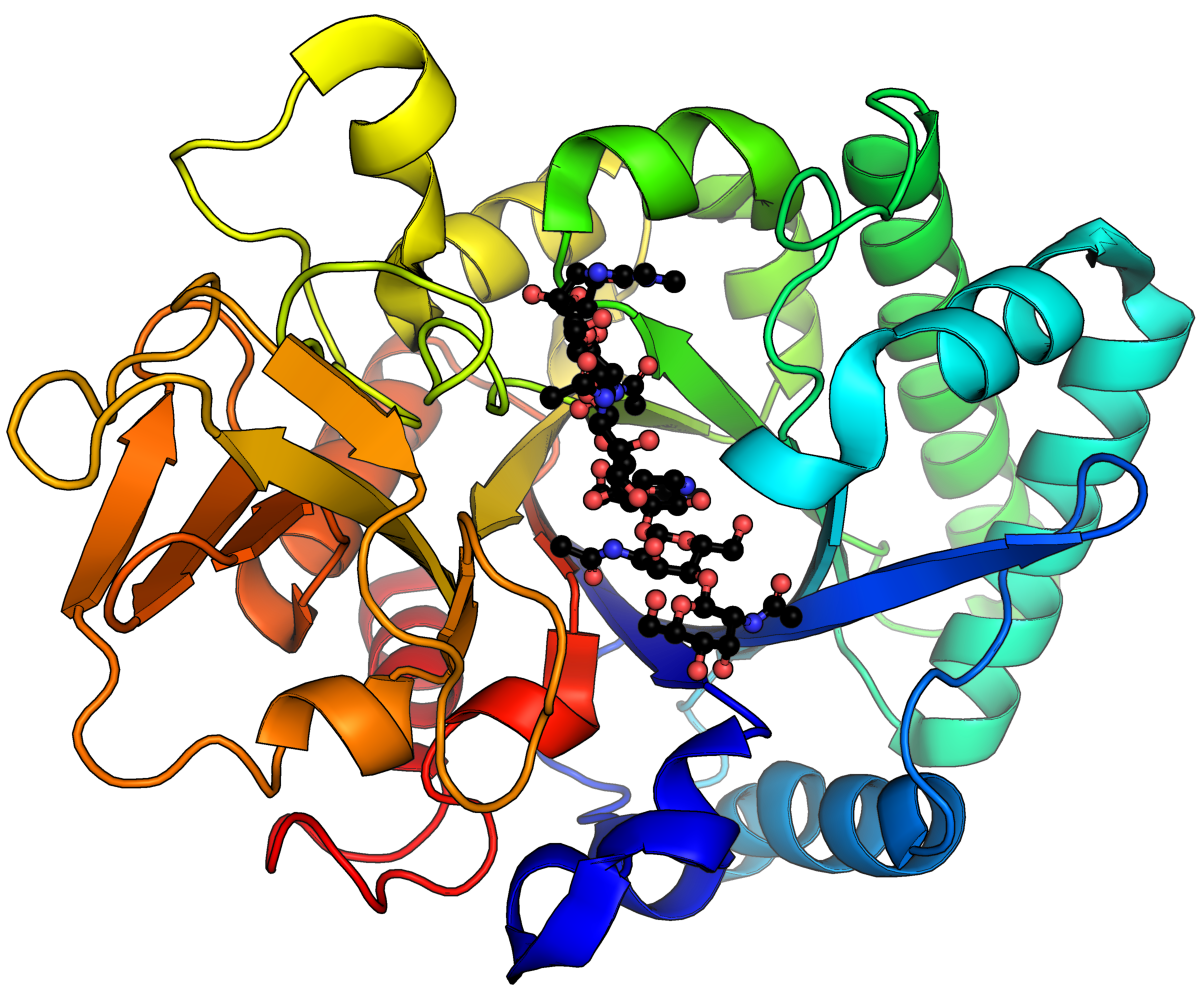
- Homo sapiens chitotriosidase bound with two molecules of inhibitor allosamidin PDB: 1HKK

Identifiers
- Symbol: CHIT1
- NCBI gene: 1118
- HGNC: 1936
- OMIM: 600031
- RefSeq: NM_003465
- UniProt: Q13231

Other data
- EC number: 3.2.1.14
- Locus: Chr. 1 q31-q32
Search for
- Structures: Swiss-model
- Domains: InterPro

=== Acidic mammalian chitinase ===
Acidic mammalian chitinase is a form of chitinase that in humans is encoded by the gene CHIA. This enzyme is secreted and can degrade chitin and chitotriose. It is thought to participate in the defense against pathogens like fungi and nematodes. It is highly expressed in the stomach, and has also been found at lower levels the lungs, especially in people with asthma. As its name suggests (and unlike CHIT1), CHIA is very stable in acid, and has an optimal pH of around 2.

=== Chitotriosidase-1 ===
Chitotriosidase-1 is a form of chitinase that in humans is encoded by the gene CHIT1. CHIT1 has been reported to degrade chitobiose, in addition to the chitin and chitotriose which CHIA has been reported to degrade. Like CHIA, it can be secreted, and is thought to be involved in defense against pathogens, but some amount has also been found in the lysosomes. High levels have been found in the blood of people with Gaucher disease type 1, and it has been used as a diagnostic tool. CHIT1 has been found in the spleen and secreted by macrophages.

== Function ==
=== Remodeling ===
Chitin-producing organisms use chitinase to break down their chitin cells as their growth requires. For example, fungal cell division is linked to chitinase activity to allow the daughter cells to separate.

=== Feeding ===
Like cellulose, chitin is an abundant biopolymer that is relatively resistant to degradation. Many mammals can digest chitin and the specific chitinase levels in vertebrate species are adapted to their feeding behaviours. Certain fish are able to digest chitin.

Chitinases, specifically the acidic mammalian chitinases (AMCase, human gene CHIA), have been isolated from the stomachs of mammals, including humans. AMCase is resistant to digestive proteases. It cleaves chitin into (GlcNAc)_{2}. The production of AMCase by the gastric chief cell requires a type 2 immune response to be mounted against chitin.

=== Immunity ===
Chitinase activity can also be detected in human blood and possibly cartilage. This may be a form of innate immunity against chitin-shelled parasites. In mammals, the acidic chitinase (CHIA) has been linked to anti-nematode immunity and the chitotriosidase (CHIT1) in anti-yeast/antifungal immunity.

Mammal also have chitinase-like proteins, derived from ancient gene duplications of a chitinase but disabled by a subsequent mutation. The mutation still allows the protein to bind to chitin, turning them into a kind of lectin termed the chilectins. Their expression is also controlled by the immune system.

Plant chitinases are related to antifungal immunity and are considered a kind of pathogenesis-related protein. The plant versions are not very efficient at attacking insect chitins, however: a bean (Phaseolus vulgaris) chitinase does not confer any protection against the tomato moth when transferred into potatoes.

== Clinical significance ==
Production of chitinases and chilectins in the human body is mainly induced by the immune system. High expression levels indicate a more active (potentially over-active) immune system and are linked to inflammatory conditions such as allergies and asthma.

== Regulation in fungi ==
Regulation varies from species to species, and within an organism, chitinases with different physiological functions would be under different regulation mechanisms. For example, chitinases that are involved in maintenance, such as remodeling the cell wall, are constitutively expressed. However, chitinases that have specialized functions, such as degrading exogenous chitin or participating in cell division, need spatio-temporal regulation of the chitinase activity.

The regulation of an endochitinase in Trichoderma atroviride is dependent on a N-acetylglucosaminidase, and the data indicates a feedback-loop where the break down of chitin produces N-acetylglucosamine, which would be possibly taken up and triggers up-regulation of the chitinbiosidases.

In Saccharomyces cerevisiae and the regulation of ScCts1p (S. cerevisiae chitinase 1), one of the chitinases involved in cell separation after cytokinesis by degrading the chitin of the primary septum. As these types of chitinases are important in cell division, there must be tight regulation and activation. Specifically, Cts1 expression has to be activated in daughter cells during late mitosis and the protein has to localize at the daughter site of the septum. And to do this, there must be coordination with other networks controlling the different phases of the cell, such as Cdc14 Early Anaphase Release (FEAR), mitotic exit network (MEN), and regulation of Ace2p (transcription factor) and cellular morphogenesis (RAM) signalling networks. Overall, the integration of the different regulatory networks allows for the cell wall degrading chitinase to function dependent on the cell's stage in the cell cycle and at specific locations among the daughter cells.

== Presence in food ==
Chitinases occur naturally in many common foods. Phaseolus vulgaris, bananas, chestnuts, kiwifruit, avocados, papaya, and tomatoes, for example, all contain significant levels of chitinase, as defense against fungal and invertebrate attack. Stress, or environmental signals like ethylene gas, may stimulate increased production of chitinase.

Some parts of chitinase molecules, almost identical in structure to hevein or other proteins in rubber latex due to their similar function in plant defense, may trigger an allergic cross-reaction known as latex-fruit syndrome.

== Applications ==
Chitinases have a wealth of applications, some of which have already been realized by industry. This includes bio-conversion of chitin to useful products such as fertilizer, the production of non-allergenic, non-toxic, biocompatible, and biodegradable materials (contact lenses, artificial skin and sutures with these qualities are already being produced) and enhancement of insecticides and fungicides.

A transgenic maize expressing an insect chitinase is able to kill the Sesamia cretica feeding on it. Transgenic plants producing extra copies of plant chitinase have higher resistance to fungi pathogens.

Possible future applications of chitinases are as food additives to increase shelf life, therapeutic agent for asthma and chronic rhinosinusitis, as an anti-fungal remedy, an anti-tumor drug and as a general ingredient to be used in protein engineering.

== See also ==
- Ligninase
