= Separase =

Mammalian protein found in Homo sapiens

Identifiers
- EC no.: 3.4.22.49
- CAS no.: 351527-77-0

Databases
- BRENDA: enzyme data
- ExPASy: NiceZyme view
- KEGG: enzyme entry
- MetaCyc: metabolic pathway
- Rhea: reactions
- PDB structures: RCSB PDB PDBe PDBsum
Search
- PMC: articles
- PubMed: articles
- NCBI: proteins

ESPL1

Identifiers
- Aliases: ESPL1, ESP1, SEPA, EPAS1, Separase, extra spindle pole bodies like 1, separase
- External IDs: OMIM: 604143; MGI: 2146156; GeneCards: ESPL1
Enzyme activity
EC #	BRENDA	ExPASy	KEGG	MetaCyc
3.4.22.49	↗	↗	↗	↗

Gene location (Human)
Chr.	Chromosome 12 (human)
Band	12q13.13	Start	53,268,299 bp
Band	12q13.13	End	53,293,638 bp

Gene location (Mouse)
Chr.	Chromosome 15 (mouse)
Band	15|15 F2	Start	102,204,701 bp
Band	15|15 F2	End	102,232,792 bp
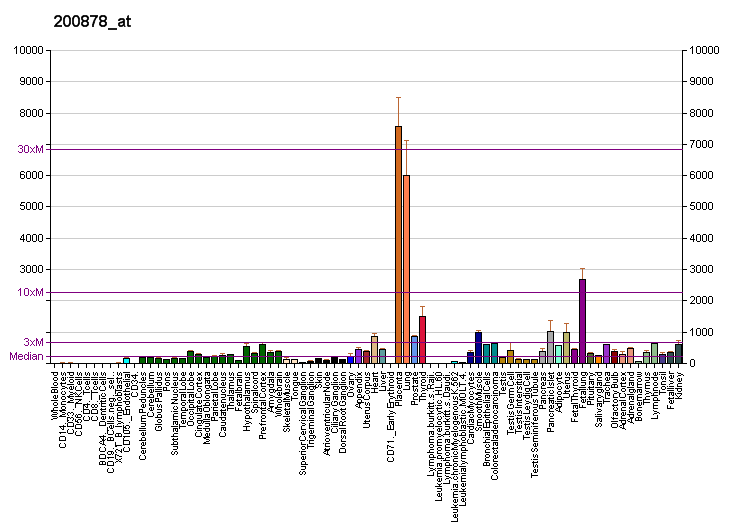
RNA expression pattern
Bgee	Human / Mouse (ortholog); Top expressed in: secondary oocyte; ventricular zone; jejunal mucosa; oral cavity; gonad; mucosa of ileum; embryo; gingival epithelium; amniotic fluid; mucosa of pharynx / Top expressed in: oocyte; primary oocyte; epiblast; secondary oocyte; hand; ventricular zone; seminiferous tubule; superior cervical ganglion; spermatid; spermatocyte; More reference expression data
BioGPS	More reference expression data
Gene ontology
Molecular function	cysteine-type peptidase activity; peptidase activity; catalytic activity; protein binding; cysteine-type endopeptidase activity; hydrolase activity
Cellular component	cytoplasm; cytosol; centrosome; mitotic spindle; nucleus
Biological process	negative regulation of sister chromatid cohesion; chromosome segregation; homologous chromosome segregation; proteolysis; positive regulation of mitotic metaphase/anaphase transition; meiotic chromosome separation; meiotic spindle organization; meiosis I; mitotic sister chromatid segregation; establishment of mitotic spindle localization; apoptotic process; mitotic cell cycle; mitotic cytokinesis
Sources:Amigo / QuickGO
Orthologs
Databases	NCBI: entry; OMA: entry
Species	Human	Mouse
Entrez	9700	105988
Ensembl	ENSG00000135476	ENSMUSG00000058290
UniProt	Q14674	P60330
RefSeq (mRNA)	NM_012291	NM_001014976; NM_001356312
RefSeq (protein)	NP_036423	NP_001014976; NP_001343241
Location (UCSC)	Chr 12: 53.27 – 53.29 Mb	Chr 15: 102.2 – 102.23 Mb
PubMed search
- Wikidata
View/Edit Human	View/Edit Mouse

Separase, also known as separin, is a cysteine protease responsible for triggering anaphase by hydrolysing cohesin, which is the protein responsible for binding sister chromatids during the early stage of anaphase. In humans, separin is encoded by the ESPL1 gene.

== History ==
In S. cerevisiae, separase is encoded by the esp1 gene. Esp1 was discovered by Kim Nasmyth and coworkers in 1998. In 2021, structures of human separase were determined in complex with either securin or CDK1-cyclin B1-CKS1 using cryo-EM by scientists of the University of Geneva.

== Function ==
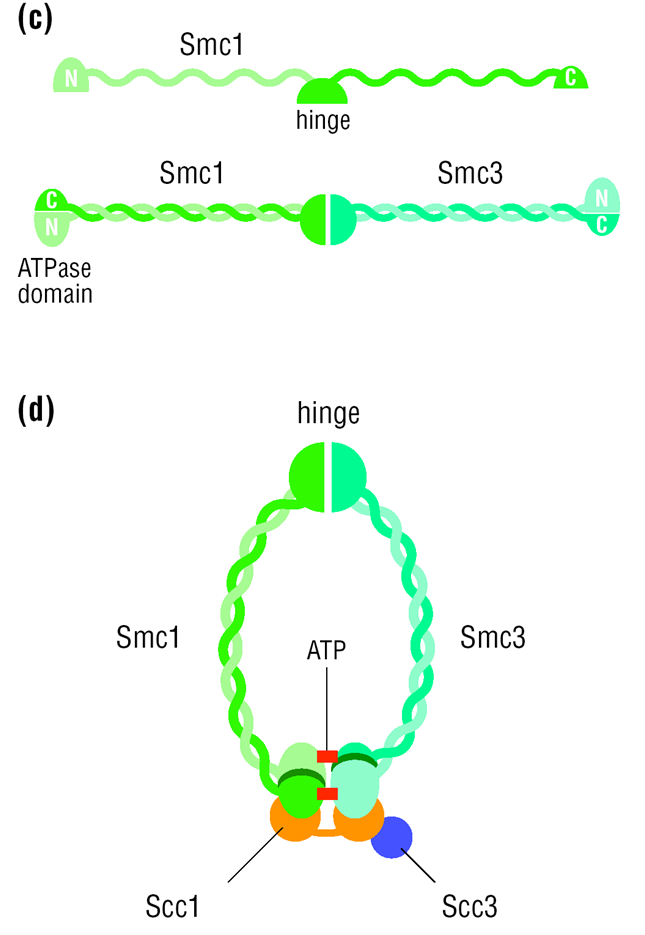
The yeast cohesin complex consists of specialized proteins, including Scc1.

Stable cohesion between sister chromatids before anaphase and their timely separation during anaphase are critical for cell division and chromosome inheritance. In vertebrates, sister chromatid cohesion is released in 2 steps via distinct mechanisms. The first step involves phosphorylation of STAG1 or STAG2 in the cohesin complex. The second step involves cleavage of the cohesin subunit SCC1 (RAD21) by separase, which initiates the final separation of sister chromatids.

In S. cerevisiae, Esp1 is coded by ESP1 and is regulated by the securin Pds1. The two sister chromatids are initially bound together by the cohesin complex until the beginning of anaphase, at which point the mitotic spindle pulls the two sister chromatids apart, leaving each of the two daughter cells with an equivalent number of sister chromatids. The proteins that bind the two sister chromatids, disallowing any premature sister chromatid separation, are a part of the cohesin protein family. One of these cohesin proteins crucial for sister chromatid cohesion is Scc1. Esp1 is a separase protein that cleaves the cohesin subunit Scc1 (RAD21), allowing sister chromatids to separate at the onset of anaphase during mitosis.

== Regulation ==
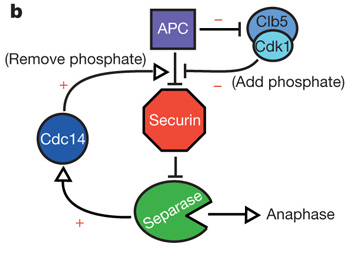
Network diagram with feedback loops to generate switch-like activation of anaphase.

When the cell is not dividing, separase is prevented from cleaving cohesin through its association with either securin or upon phosphorylation of a specific serine residue in separase by the cyclin-CDK complex. Separase phosphorylation leads to a stable association with CDK1-cyclin B1. Securin or CDK1-cyclin B binding is mutually exclusive. In both complexes, separase is inhibited by pseudosubstrate motifs that block substrate binding at the catalytic site and at nearby docking sites. However, while securin contains its own pseudosubstrate motifs to occlude substrate binding, the CDK1–cyclin B complex inhibits separase by rigidifying pseudosubstrate motifs from flexible loops in separase itself, leading to an auto-inhibition of the proteolytic activity of separase. Regulation through these distinct binding partners provides two layers of negative regulation to prevent inappropriate cohesin cleavage. Note that separase cannot function without initially forming the securin-separase complex in most organisms. This is because securin helps properly fold separase into the functional conformation. However, yeast does not appear to require securin to form functional separase because anaphase occurs in yeast even with a securin deletion.

On the signal for anaphase, securin is ubiquitinated and hydrolysed, releasing separase for dephosphorylation by the APC-Cdc20 complex. Active separase can then cleave Scc1 for release of the sister chromatids.

Separase initiates the activation of Cdc14 in early anaphase and Cdc14 has been found to dephosphorylate securin, thereby increasing its efficiency as a substrate for degradation. The presence of this positive feedback loop offers a potential mechanism for giving anaphase a more switch-like behavior.

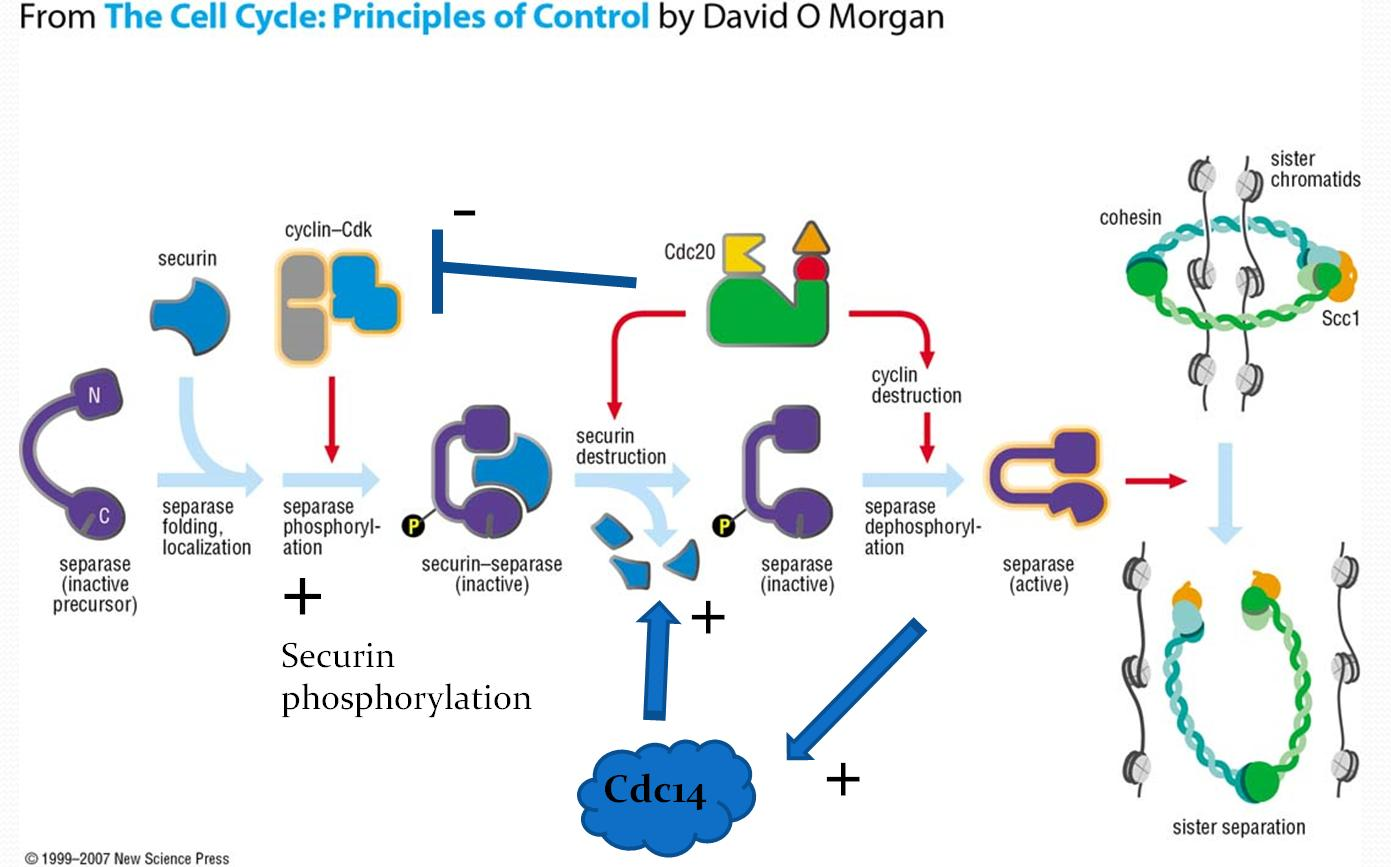
Figure 4: Potential network diagram involving securin and separase to generate switch-like activation of anaphase
