= Glycoside hydrolase family 19 =

Enzyme

Glycosyl hydrolases family 19
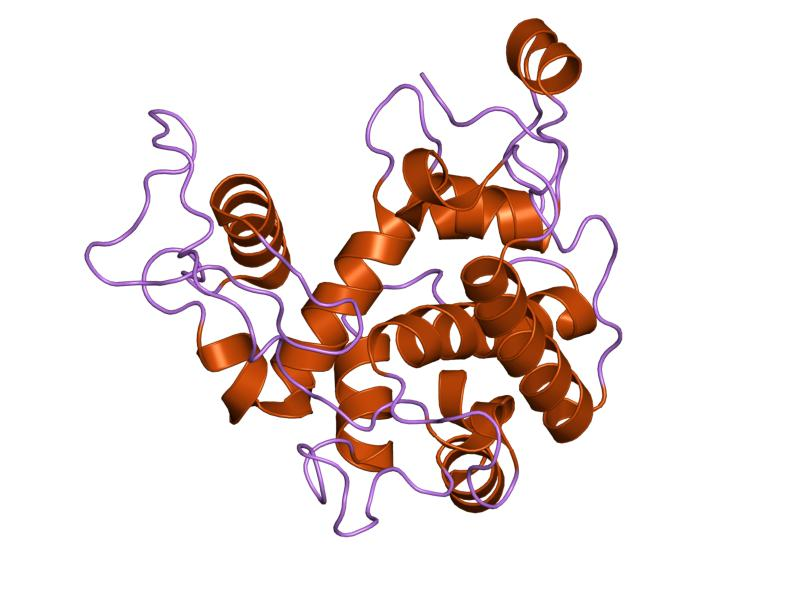
- the refined crystal structure of an endochitinase from hordeum vulgare l. seeds to 1.8 angstroms resolution

Identifiers
- Symbol: Glyco_hydro_19
- Pfam: PF00182
- Pfam clan: CL0037
- InterPro: IPR000726
- PROSITE: PDOC00620
- SCOP2: 2baa / SCOPe / SUPFAM
- CAZy: GH19
- CDD: cd00325
Available protein structures:
- PDB: IPR000726 PF00182 (ECOD; PDBsum)
- AlphaFold: IPR000726; PF00182

In molecular biology, Glycoside hydrolase family 19 is a family of glycoside hydrolases EC 3.2.1., which are a widespread group of enzymes that hydrolyse the glycosidic bond between two or more carbohydrates, or between a carbohydrate and a non-carbohydrate moiety. A classification system for glycoside hydrolases, based on sequence similarity, has led to the definition of >100 different families. This classification is available on the CAZy web site, and also discussed at CAZypedia, an online encyclopedia of carbohydrate active enzymes. y[ _]9

Glycoside hydrolase family 19 CAZY GH_19 comprises enzymes with only one known activity; chitinase (EC 3.2.1.14).

Chitinases are enzymes that catalyze the hydrolysis of the beta-1,4-N-acetyl-D-glucosamine linkages in chitin polymers. Chitinases belong to glycoside hydrolase families 18 or 19. Chitinases of family 19 (also known as classes IA or I and IB or II) are enzymes from plants that function in the defence against fungal and insect pathogens by destroying their chitin-containing cell wall. Class IA/I and IB/II enzymes differ in the presence (IA/I) or absence (IB/II) of a N-terminal chitin-binding domain. The catalytic domain of these enzymes consist of about 220 to 230 amino acid residues.

== Active site ==
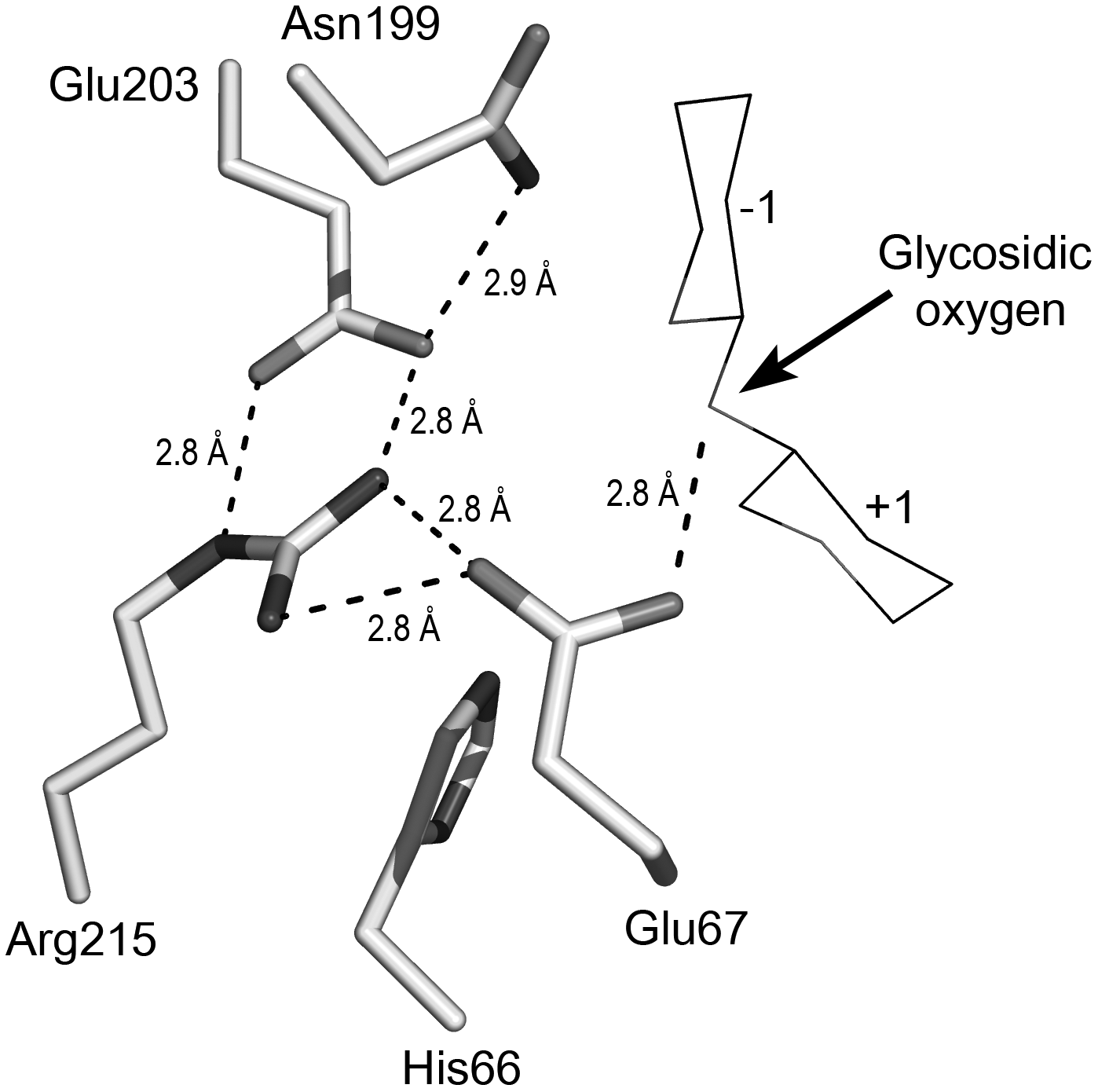
Active site of gycoside hydrolase family 19 papaya chitinase (PDB: 3cql). Conserved residues are shown surrounding the catalytic acid, Glu67. A GlcNAc2 unit binding in the -1 and +1 subsites is shown in narrow stick representation and an arrow indicates the position of the glycosidic oxygen.

GH19 enzymes has a conserved sequence motif ([FHY]-G-R-G-[AP]-ζ-Q-[IL]-[ST]-[FHYW]-[HN]-[FY]-[NY], ζ= hydrophilic amino acid) in its active site.
