= Glycoside hydrolase family 20 =

Family of glycoside hydrolases

Glycosyl hydrolase family 20, catalytic domain
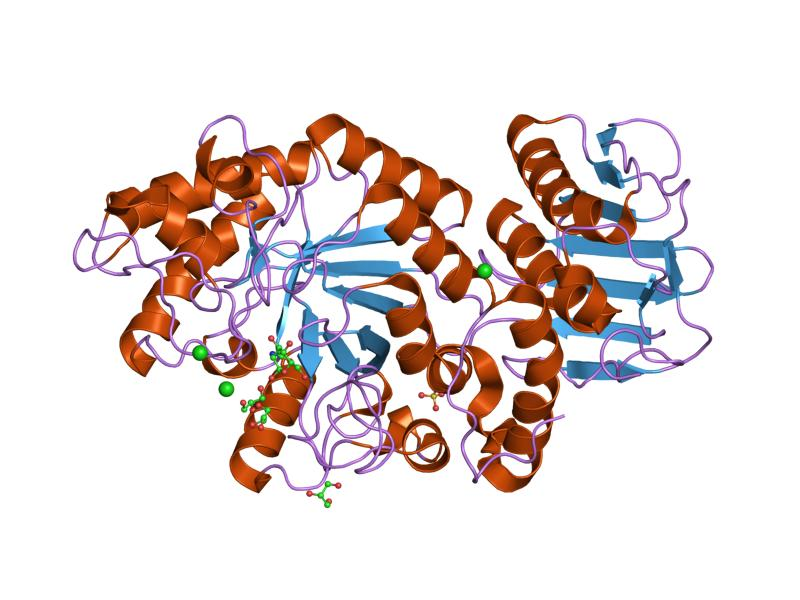
- wildtype streptomyces plicatus beta-hexosaminidase in complex with product (glcnac)

Identifiers
- Symbol: Glyco_hydro_20
- Pfam: PF00728
- Pfam clan: CL0058
- InterPro: IPR015883
- SCOP2: 1qba / SCOPe / SUPFAM
- CAZy: GH20
- CDD: cd02742
Available protein structures:
- PDB: IPR015883 PF00728 (ECOD; PDBsum)
- AlphaFold: IPR015883; PF00728

Glycosyl hydrolase family 20, domain 2
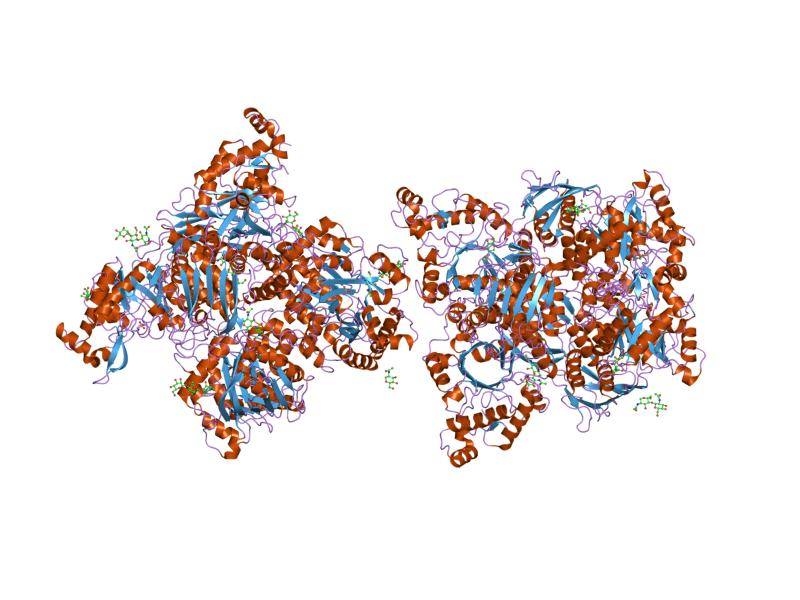
- crystallographic structure of human beta-hexosaminidase a

Identifiers
- Symbol: Glyco_hydro_20b
- Pfam: PF02838
- InterPro: IPR015882
- SCOP2: 1qba / SCOPe / SUPFAM
- CAZy: GH20
Available protein structures:
- PDB: IPR015882 PF02838 (ECOD; PDBsum)
- AlphaFold: IPR015882; PF02838

In molecular biology, glycoside hydrolase family 20 is a family of glycoside hydrolases.

Glycoside hydrolases EC 3.2.1. are a widespread group of enzymes that hydrolyse the glycosidic bond between two or more carbohydrates, or between a carbohydrate and a non-carbohydrate moiety. A classification system for glycoside hydrolases, based on sequence similarity, has led to the definition of >100 different families. This classification is available on the CAZy web site, and also discussed at CAZypedia, an online encyclopedia of carbohydrate active enzymes.

Glycoside hydrolase family 20 CAZY GH_20 comprises enzymes with several known activities; beta-hexosaminidase (EC 3.2.1.52); lacto-N-biosidase (EC 3.2.1.140). Carbonyl oxygen of the C-2 acetamido group of the substrate acts as the catalytic nucleophile/base in this family of enzymes.

In the brain and other tissues, beta-hexosaminidase A degrades GM2 gangliosides; specifically, the enzyme hydrolyses terminal non-reducing N-acetyl-D-hexosamine residues in N-acetyl-beta-D-hexosaminides. There are 3 forms of beta-hexosaminidase: hexosaminidase A is a trimer, with one alpha, one beta-A and one beta-B chain; hexosaminidase B is a tetramer of two beta-A and two beta-B chains; and hexosaminidase S is a homodimer of alpha chains. The two beta chains are derived from the cleavage of a precursor. Mutations in the beta-chain lead to Sandhoff disease, a lysosomal storage disorder characterised by accumulation of GM2 ganglioside.
