= Cdc14 =

Cdc14 and Cdc14 are a gene and its protein product respectively. Cdc14 is found in most of the eukaryotes. Cdc14 was defined by Hartwell in his famous screen for loci that control the cell cycle of Saccharomyces cerevisiae. Cdc14 was later shown to encode a protein phosphatase. Cdc14 is dual-specificity, which means it has serine/threonine and tyrosine-directed activity. A preference for serines next to proline is reported. Many early studies, especially in the budding yeast Saccharomyces cerevisiae, demonstrated that the protein plays a key role in regulating late mitotic processes. However, more recent work in a range of systems suggests that its cellular function is more complex.

== Cellular function ==
In Saccharomyces cerevisiae, the species in which Cdc14 activity is best understood and most-studied, the activity of Cdc14 (ScCdc14) leads to mitotic exit by dephosphorylating targets of Cdk1, a well-studied cyclin-dependent protein kinase. Cdc14 antagonizes Cdk1 by stimulating proteolysis of its cyclin partner (cyclin B), through the dephosphorylation of Cdh1, a regulator of the anaphase-promoting complex. Cdc14 also dephosphorylates Swi5 to enhance transcription of Sic1, an inhibitor of Cdk1.

This "simple" mitotic exit model became complicated as additional roles in mitosis were attributed to ScCdc14. These included stabilizing the spindle and regulating cytokinesis and rDNA/ telomere segregation. Consistent with such multiple roles, ScCdc14 has been found to bind several proteins that regulate the cell cycle and DNA replication, or that associate with the spindle or kinetochore.

Work in other yeasts further complicated the understanding of the role of Cdc14. Mutants in the ortholog of the fission Schizosaccharomyces pombe exit mitosis normally (unlike S. cerevisiae) but are altered in septation and cytokinesis. Also, while the protein regulates the Cdk1 ortholog of S. pombe, this occurs through a process unlike that of S. cerevisiae; it does not dephosphorylate the Sic1 or Cdh1 orthologs, but promotes the inactivation of Cdc2 by down-regulating Cdc25 phosphatase. Cdc14 of Candida albicans is also involved in septation and cytokinesis, but not mitotic exit.

Studies of Cdc14 in animal systems has further muddled the Cdc14 story. Animals have up to three diverged Cdc14 genes, with multiple splice variants, that appear to diverge in function and location. Also, several crucial studies have yielded contradictory results. The nematode Caenorhabditis elegans makes one Cdc14 (CeCdc14), which localizes to the spindle and centrosomes in mitosis, and to the cytoplasm at interphase. One RNAi study with CeCdc14 caused cytokinesis defects, which was consistent with similar work in Xenopus laevis. However, a second RNAi study showed no defects, and it was suggested that the first experiment used too many oligonucleotides which caused off-target effects. Contradictory data also exist with human Cdc14. Unlike CeCdc14, hCdc14A is not centrosomic in mitosis, but is cytoplasmic and centrosomic during interphase. HCdc14B was shown in one study to be primarily nucleolar like ScCdc14 (but unlike CeCdc14), but others detected hCdc14B on nuclear filaments and the spindle

While RNAi depletion of hCdc14A and hCdc14B led to defects in centriole duplication, cell cycle progression, and mitotic exit, cells deleted for the genes showed no defects in growth or mitosis, and a similar failure of a cell cycle defect was also shown in cultured human cells using conditional hCdc14A and hCdc14B knockouts. Finally, in chicken, knockout lines totally lacked defects in cell-cycle progression, mitotic entry or exit, cytokinesis, or centrosome behavior. There is evidence that Cdc14 may participate in a DNA damage checkpoint.

A novel role for Cdc14 in eukaryotes was suggested by studies of Phytophthora infestans, a eukaryotic microbe known best as the cause of the Great Famine of Ireland. Notably, while the species mentioned above are all relatively close taxonomic relatives (in the Fungi/Metazoa group), P. infestans has a distinct evolutionary history; it is classified as an oomycete, and is a member of the Kingdom Stramenopila (the Heterokonts in some schemes) along with diatoms and brown algae. The single Cdc14 gene of P. infestans (PiCdc14) is expressed distinctly from those of fungi and metazoans; instead of being transcribed throughout the cell cycle and regulated post-translationally, PiCdc14 is under strong transcriptional control and is not expressed in hyphae, where most mitosis takes place. Instead, PiCdc14 is made during the formation of asexual spores, including its biflagellated zoospores. PiCdc14 was found to accumulate near the basal bodies, at the base of the flagella. In light of the varying roles of Cdc14 in fungi and animals, it was suggested that the P. infestans data implied that an ancestral role of Cdc14 involved the flagella stage of eukaryotes. Additional data in support of this theory was later obtained from studies in zebrafish, where its Cdc14 proteins were also found to localize to the basal body and play roles in the formation of cilia, which are short forms of flagella.

Cdc14 is also involved in regulation of key steps during meiosis in budding yeast. Cdc55, a regulatory subunit of Protein phosphatase 2 (PP2A), sequesters Cdc14 in the nucleolus during early stage of meiosis. The sequestration of Cdc14 is necessary for assembling the meiosis I spindle. Although, the early stage sequestration of Cdc14 is not essential for separation of chromosomes. FEAR (Cdc Fourteen Early Anaphase Release) complex proteins, SLK19 and SPO12 regulate the release of Cdc14. The release of Cdc14 from nucleolus results in cdk1 inactivation and ultimately in disassembly of spindle during Anaphase of meiosis I. Cells deprived of Cdc14 or SLK19 and SPO12 have abnormal meiosis. They have only one division during meiosis. The chromosomes also segregate abnormally. The abnormality arises due to delay in dissembling of spindle during Anaphase I. However, the segregation of chromosomes continue and both the phases of meiotic segregations take place on prolonged meiosis I spindle. Cdc14 along with SPO12 and SLK19 play a critical role in ensuring that the two phases of chromosomal segregation take place consecutively during meiosis.

== Distribution of Cdc14 through evolution ==
Cdc14 is widely distributed, being found in most eukaryote kingdoms. However, it is not found in all species based on searches of sequenced genomes. One or more Cdc14 genes are found in alveolates, animals, fungi, trypanosomes, and lower plants. However, Cdc14 genes have apparently been lost in some lineages, including higher plants, rhodophytes, and slime molds. There is a fairly tight positive correlation between the presence of Cdc14 in a species and whether that species makes flagella or cilia. This may be related to the ancestral role of Cdc14. Whether flagella-anchoring basal bodies or centrioles involved in mitosis appeared first during evolution has been debated, but one theory is that flagella evolved first as a motility and sensory organelle, and the basal body was later co-opted into a mitotic role. The function of Cdc14 may have adapted to different functions during the evolution of those organelles.

== Targets ==
Most information about the biochemical function of Cdc14 comes from studies of S. cerevisiae. In that species, one important target is Cdh1/Hct1. Cdh1 associates with the APC and leads to APC activity (anaphase promoting complex); activated APC is a key driver in mitotic exit. Furthermore, Cdc14 dephosphorylates the stoichiometric inhibitor of the mitotic cyclins, Sic1, stabilizing Sic1 protein. Cdc14 activity also leads to the stabilization of the transcription factor Swi5, leading to an upregulation of Sic1 transcription. It is possible that Cdc14 acts as a phosphatase on all Clb-Cdk1 targets, acting to reverse the effects of the mitotic cyclins.

The targets of Cdc14 are apparently quite diverse. Yeast two-hybrid and affinity capture methods have identified many proteins that potentially interact with ScCdc14, including those known to regulate the cell cycle and DNA replication, or that associate with the spindle or kinetochore. Cdc14 also appears to inhibit RNA polymerase I, which helps allow complete chromosome disjunction by eliminating ribosomal RNA (rRNA) transcripts that otherwise would block condensin binding to rDNA.

== Regulation ==
In S. cerevisiae, Cdc14 is regulated by its competitive inhibitor Cfi/Net1, which localizes Cdc14 to the nucleolus. During anaphase, Cdc14 is "uncaged" and spreads to the rest of the cell. Two networks mediate the release of Cdc14 from the nucleolus: FEAR (CDC Fourteen Early Anaphase Release) and MEN (Mitotic Exit Network); while these networks are complex, it is thought that these networks result in the phosphorylation of Cfi/Net1 and/or Cdc14, resulting in disassociation of the complex. In S. pombe, phosphorylation of the Cdc14 ortholog by Cdk1 is known to directly inhibit the catalytic activity of the phosphatase.
