= List of glycoside hydrolase families =

Glycoside hydrolases (O-Glycosyl hydrolases) EC 3.2.1. are a widespread group of enzymes that hydrolyse the glycosidic bond between two or more carbohydrates, or between a carbohydrate and a non-carbohydrate moiety. A classification system for glycosyl hydrolases, based on sequence similarity, has led to the definition of numerous different families. This classification is available on the CAZy (CArbohydrate-Active EnZymes) web site. Because the fold of proteins is better conserved than their sequences, some of the families can be grouped in 'clans'. As of October 2011, CAZy includes 128 families of glycosyl hydrolases and 14 clans.

- Glycoside hydrolase family 1
- Glycoside hydrolase family 2
- Glycoside hydrolase family 3
- Glycoside hydrolase family 4
- Glycoside hydrolase family 5
- Glycoside hydrolase family 6
- Glycoside hydrolase family 7
- Glycoside hydrolase family 8
- Glycoside hydrolase family 9
- Glycoside hydrolase family 10
- Glycoside hydrolase family 11
- Glycoside hydrolase family 12
- Glycoside hydrolase family 13
- Glycoside hydrolase family 14
- Glycoside hydrolase family 15
- Glycoside hydrolase family 16
- Glycoside hydrolase family 17
- Glycoside hydrolase family 18
- Glycoside hydrolase family 19
- Glycoside hydrolase family 20
- Glycoside hydrolase family 21
- Glycoside hydrolase family 22
- Glycoside hydrolase family 23
- Glycoside hydrolase family 24
- Glycoside hydrolase family 25
- Glycoside hydrolase family 26
- Glycoside hydrolase family 27
- Glycoside hydrolase family 28
- Glycoside hydrolase family 29
- Glycoside hydrolase family 30
- Glycoside hydrolase family 31
- Glycoside hydrolase family 32
- Glycoside hydrolase family 33
- Glycoside hydrolase family 34
- Glycoside hydrolase family 35
- Glycoside hydrolase family 36
- Glycoside hydrolase family 37
- Glycoside hydrolase family 38
- Glycoside hydrolase family 39
- Glycoside hydrolase family 40
- Glycoside hydrolase family 41
- Glycoside hydrolase family 42
- Glycoside hydrolase family 43
- Glycoside hydrolase family 44
- Glycoside hydrolase family 45
- Glycoside hydrolase family 46
- Glycoside hydrolase family 47
- Glycoside hydrolase family 48
- Glycoside hydrolase family 49
- Glycoside hydrolase family 50
- Glycoside hydrolase family 51
- Glycoside hydrolase family 52
- Glycoside hydrolase family 53
- Glycoside hydrolase family 54
- Glycoside hydrolase family 55
- Glycoside hydrolase family 56
- Glycoside hydrolase family 57
- Glycoside hydrolase family 58
- Glycoside hydrolase family 59
- Glycoside hydrolase family 60
- Glycoside hydrolase family 61
- Glycoside hydrolase family 62
- Glycoside hydrolase family 63
- Glycoside hydrolase family 64
- Glycoside hydrolase family 65
- Glycoside hydrolase family 66
- Glycoside hydrolase family 67
- Glycoside hydrolase family 68
- Glycoside hydrolase family 69
- Glycoside hydrolase family 70
- Glycoside hydrolase family 71
- Glycoside hydrolase family 72
- Glycoside hydrolase family 73
- Glycoside hydrolase family 74
- Glycoside hydrolase family 75
- Glycoside hydrolase family 76
- Glycoside hydrolase family 77
- Glycoside hydrolase family 78
- Glycoside hydrolase family 79
- Glycoside hydrolase family 80
- Glycoside hydrolase family 81
- Glycoside hydrolase family 82
- Glycoside hydrolase family 83
- Glycoside hydrolase family 84
- Glycoside hydrolase family 85
- Glycoside hydrolase family 86
- Glycoside hydrolase family 87
- Glycoside hydrolase family 88
- Glycoside hydrolase family 89
- Glycoside hydrolase family 90
- Glycoside hydrolase family 91
- Glycoside hydrolase family 92
- Glycoside hydrolase family 93
- Glycoside hydrolase family 94
- Glycoside hydrolase family 95
- Glycoside hydrolase family 96
- Glycoside hydrolase family 97
- Glycoside hydrolase family 98
- Glycoside hydrolase family 99
- Glycoside hydrolase family 100
- Glycoside hydrolase family 101
- Glycoside hydrolase family 102
- Glycoside hydrolase family 103
- Glycoside hydrolase family 104
- Glycoside hydrolase family 105
- Glycoside hydrolase family 106
- Glycoside hydrolase family 107
- Glycoside hydrolase family 108
- Glycoside hydrolase family 109
- Glycoside hydrolase family 110
- Glycoside hydrolase family 111
- Glycoside hydrolase family 112
- Glycoside hydrolase family 113
- Glycoside hydrolase family 114
- Glycoside hydrolase family 115
- Glycoside hydrolase family 116
- Glycoside hydrolase family 117
- Glycoside hydrolase family 118
- Glycoside hydrolase family 119
- Glycoside hydrolase family 120
- Glycoside hydrolase family 121
- Glycoside hydrolase family 122
- Glycoside hydrolase family 123
- Glycoside hydrolase family 124
- Glycoside hydrolase family 125
- Glycoside hydrolase family 126
- Glycoside hydrolase family 127
- Glycoside hydrolase family 128
