= Glycoside hydrolase family 63 =

Mannosyl oligosaccharide glucosidase

Identifiers
- Symbol: Glyco_hydro_63
- Pfam: PF03200
- Pfam clan: CL0059
- InterPro: IPR004888
- CAZy: GH63
- Membranome: 527
Available protein structures:
- PDB: IPR004888 PF03200 (ECOD; PDBsum)
- AlphaFold: IPR004888; PF03200

In molecular biology, glycoside hydrolase family 63 is a family of glycoside hydrolases.

Glycoside hydrolases EC 3.2.1. are a widespread group of enzymes that hydrolyse the glycosidic bond between two or more carbohydrates, or between a carbohydrate and a non-carbohydrate moiety. A classification system for glycoside hydrolases, based on sequence similarity, has led to the definition of >100 different families. This classification is available on the CAZy web site, and also discussed at CAZypedia, an online encyclopedia of carbohydrate active enzymes.

Glycosyl hydrolase family 63 (CAZY GH_63) is a family of eukaryotic enzymes. They catalyse the specific cleavage of the non-reducing terminal glucose residue from Glc(3)Man(9)GlcNAc(2). Mannosyl oligosaccharide glucosidase EC 3.2.1.106 is the first enzyme in the N-linked oligosaccharide processing pathway.
