= Glycoside hydrolase family 43 =

Glyco_hydro_43

Identifiers
- Symbol: Glyco_hydro_43
- Pfam: PF04616
- Pfam clan: CL0143
- InterPro: IPR006710
- SCOP2: 1gyh / SCOPe / SUPFAM
- CAZy: GH43
- CDD: cd08978
- Membranome: 553
Available protein structures:
- PDB: IPR006710 PF04616 (ECOD; PDBsum)
- AlphaFold: IPR006710; PF04616

In molecular biology, glycoside hydrolase family 43 is a family of glycoside hydrolases.

Glycoside hydrolases EC 3.2.1. are a widespread group of enzymes that hydrolyse the glycosidic bond between two or more carbohydrates, or between a carbohydrate and a non-carbohydrate moiety. A classification system for glycoside hydrolases, based on sequence similarity, has led to the definition of >100 different families. This classification is available on the CAZy web site, and also discussed at CAZypedia, an online encyclopedia of carbohydrate active enzymes.

Glycoside hydrolase family 43 CAZY GH_43 includes enzymes with the following activities, beta-xylosidase (EC 3.2.1.37), alpha-L-arabinofuranosidase (EC 3.2.1.55); arabinanase (EC 3.2.1.99), and xylanase (EC 3.2.1.8). The structure of arabinanase Arb43A from Cellvibrio japonicus reveals a five-bladed beta-propeller fold. A long V-shaped groove, partially enclosed at one end, forms a single extended substrate-binding surface across the face of the propeller.
