= Glycoside hydrolase family 35 =

Glycosyl hydrolases family 35
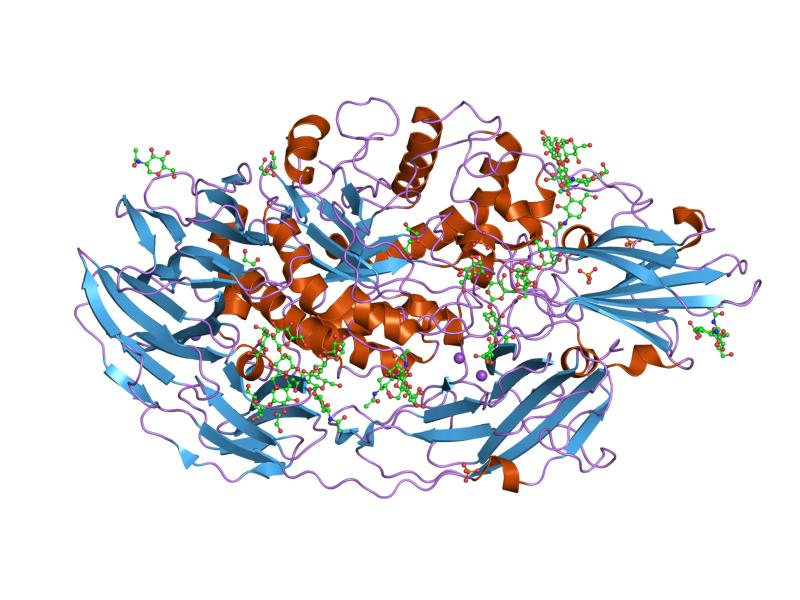
- native structure of beta-galactosidase from penicillium sp.

Identifiers
- Symbol: Glyco_hydro_35
- Pfam: PF01301
- Pfam clan: CL0058
- InterPro: IPR001944
- PROSITE: PDOC00910
- CAZy: GH35
- Membranome: 788
Available protein structures:
- PDB: IPR001944 PF01301 (ECOD; PDBsum)
- AlphaFold: IPR001944; PF01301

In molecular biology, glycoside hydrolase family 35 is a family of glycoside hydrolases.

Glycoside hydrolases EC 3.2.1. are a widespread group of enzymes that hydrolyse the glycosidic bond between two or more carbohydrates, or between a carbohydrate and a non-carbohydrate moiety. A classification system for glycoside hydrolases, based on sequence similarity, has led to the definition of >100 different families. This classification is available on the CAZy web site, and also discussed at CAZypedia, an online encyclopedia of carbohydrate active enzymes.

Glycoside hydrolase family 35 CAZY GH_35 comprises enzymes with only one known activity; beta-galactosidase (EC 3.2.1.23). Mammalian beta-galactosidase is a lysosomal enzyme (gene GLB1) which cleaves the terminal galactose from gangliosides, glycoproteins, and glycosaminoglycans and whose deficiency is the cause of the genetic disease Gm(1) gangliosidosis (Morquio disease type B).
