= Glycoside hydrolase family 38 =

Glycosyl hydrolases family 38 N-terminal domain
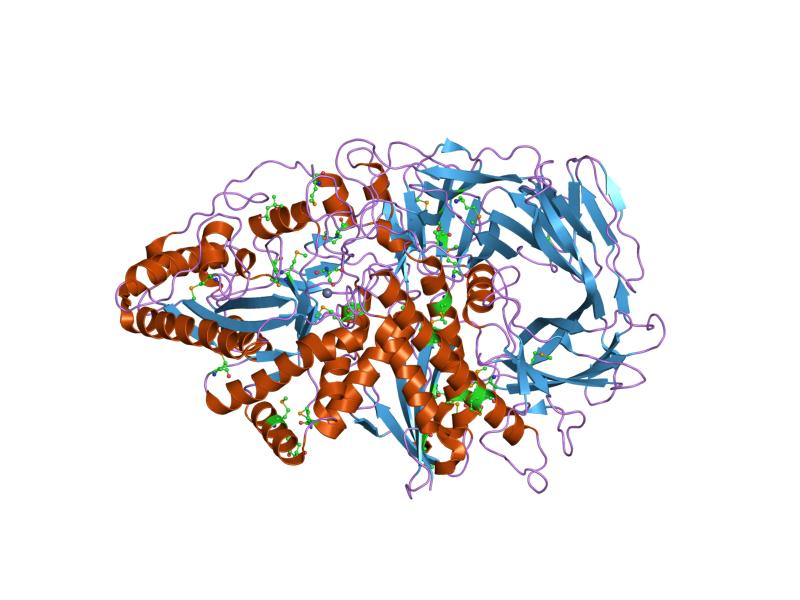
- golgi alpha-mannosidase ii

Identifiers
- Symbol: Glyco_hydro_38
- Pfam: PF01074
- Pfam clan: CL0158
- InterPro: IPR000602
- SCOP2: 1o7d / SCOPe / SUPFAM
- CAZy: GH38
- Membranome: 311
Available protein structures:
- PDB: IPR000602 PF01074 (ECOD; PDBsum)
- AlphaFold: IPR000602; PF01074

Alpha mannosidase, middle domain
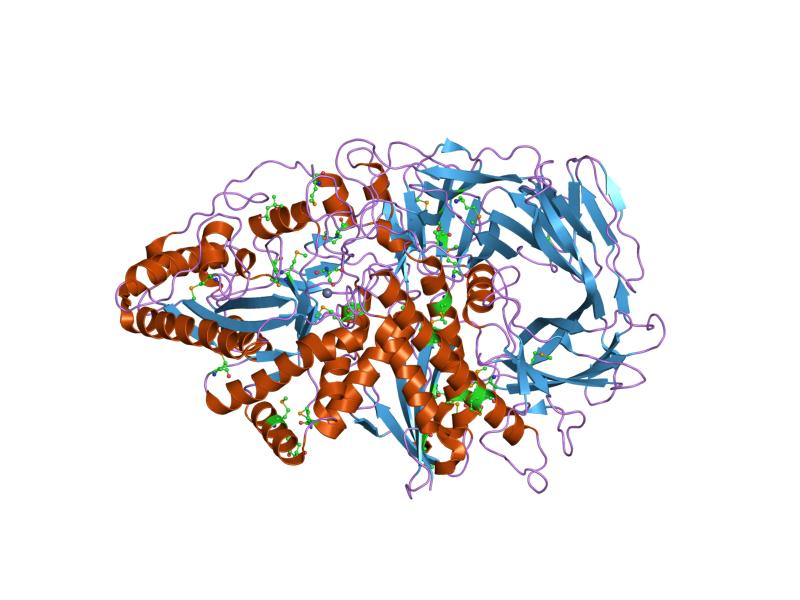
- golgi alpha-mannosidase ii

Identifiers
- Symbol: Alpha-mann_mid
- Pfam: PF09261
- InterPro: IPR015341
- SCOP2: 1o7d / SCOPe / SUPFAM
Available protein structures:
- PDB: IPR015341 PF09261 (ECOD; PDBsum)
- AlphaFold: IPR015341; PF09261

Glycosyl hydrolases family 38 C-terminal domain
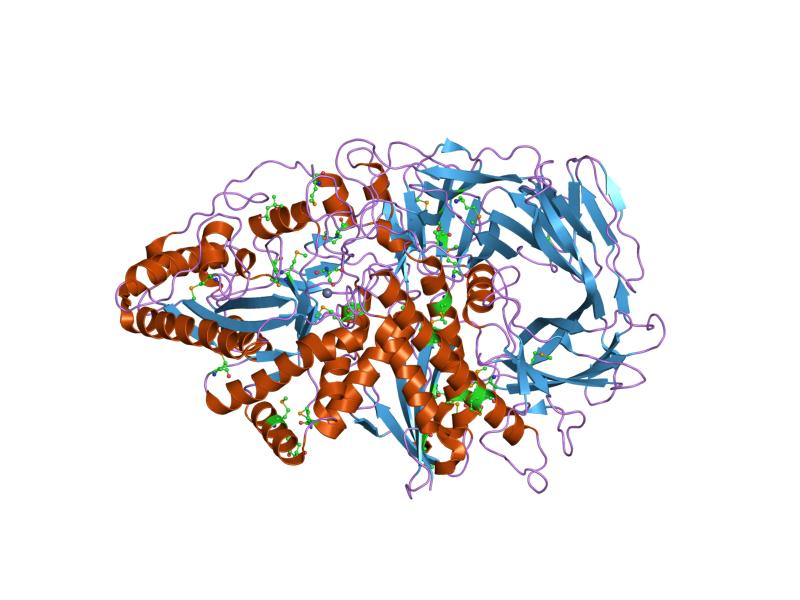
- golgi alpha-mannosidase ii

Identifiers
- Symbol: Glyco_hydro_38C
- Pfam: PF07748
- Pfam clan: CL0103
- InterPro: IPR011682
- SCOP2: 1o7d / SCOPe / SUPFAM
- CAZy: GH38
Available protein structures:
- PDB: IPR011682 PF07748 (ECOD; PDBsum)
- AlphaFold: IPR011682; PF07748

In molecular biology, glycoside hydrolase family 38 is a family of glycoside hydrolases.

Glycoside hydrolases EC 3.2.1. are a widespread group of enzymes that hydrolyse the glycosidic bond between two or more carbohydrates, or between a carbohydrate and a non-carbohydrate moiety. A classification system for glycoside hydrolases, based on sequence similarity, has led to the definition of >100 different families. This classification is available on the CAZy web site, and also discussed at CAZypedia, an online encyclopedia of carbohydrate active enzymes.

Glycoside hydrolase family 38 CAZY GH_38 comprises enzymes with only one known activity; alpha-mannosidase (EC 3.2.1.24) (EC 3.2.1.114).

Lysosomal alpha-mannosidase is necessary for the catabolism of N-linked carbohydrates released during glycoprotein turnover. The enzyme catalyzes the hydrolysis of terminal, non-reducing alpha-D-mannose residues in alpha-D-mannosides, and can cleave all known types of alpha-mannosidic linkages. Defects in the gene cause lysosomal alpha-mannosidosis (AM), a lysosomal storage disease characterised by the accumulation of unbranched oligo-saccharide chains.

A domain, which is found in the central region adopts a structure consisting of three alpha helices, in an immunoglobulin/albumin-binding domain-like fold. The domain is predominantly found in the enzyme alpha-mannosidase.
