= Glycoside hydrolase family 56 =

Hyaluronidase
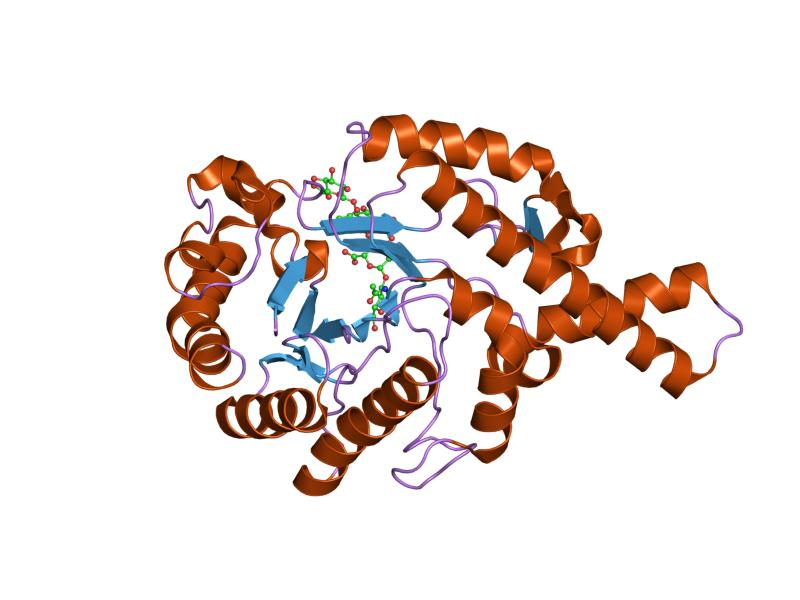
- crystal structure of bee venom hyaluronidase in complex with hyaluronic acid tetramer

Identifiers
- Symbol: Glyco_hydro_56
- Pfam: PF01630
- Pfam clan: CL0058
- InterPro: IPR018155
- SCOP2: 1fcv / SCOPe / SUPFAM
- OPM superfamily: 117
- OPM protein: 1fcq
- CAZy: GH56
- Membranome: 1078
Available protein structures:
- PDB: IPR018155 PF01630 (ECOD; PDBsum)
- AlphaFold: IPR018155; PF01630

In molecular biology, glycoside hydrolase family 56 is a family of glycoside hydrolases.

Glycoside hydrolases EC 3.2.1. are a widespread group of enzymes that hydrolyse the glycosidic bond between two or more carbohydrates, or between a carbohydrate and a non-carbohydrate moiety. A classification system for glycoside hydrolases, based on sequence similarity, has led to the definition of >100 different families. This classification is available on the CAZy web site, and also discussed at CAZypedia, an online encyclopedia of carbohydrate active enzymes.

Glycoside hydrolase family 56 CAZY GH_56 includes enzymes with hyaluronidase EC 3.2.1.35 activity. The venom of Apis mellifera (Honeybee) contains several biologically-active peptides and two enzymes, one of which is a hyaluronidase. The amino acid sequence of bee venom hyaluronidase contains 349 amino acids, and includes four cysteines and a number of potential glycosylation sites. The sequence shows a high degree of similarity to PH-20, a membrane protein of mammalian sperm involved in sperm-egg adhesion, supporting the view that hyaluronidases play a role in fertilisation.

PH-20 is required for sperm adhesion to the egg zona pellucida; it is located on both the sperm plasma membrane and acrosomal membrane. The amino acid sequence of the mature protein contains 468 amino acids, and includes six potential N-linked glycosylation sites and twelve cysteines, eight of which are tightly clustered near the C-terminus.
