= Glycoside hydrolase family 48 =

Glyco_hydro_48
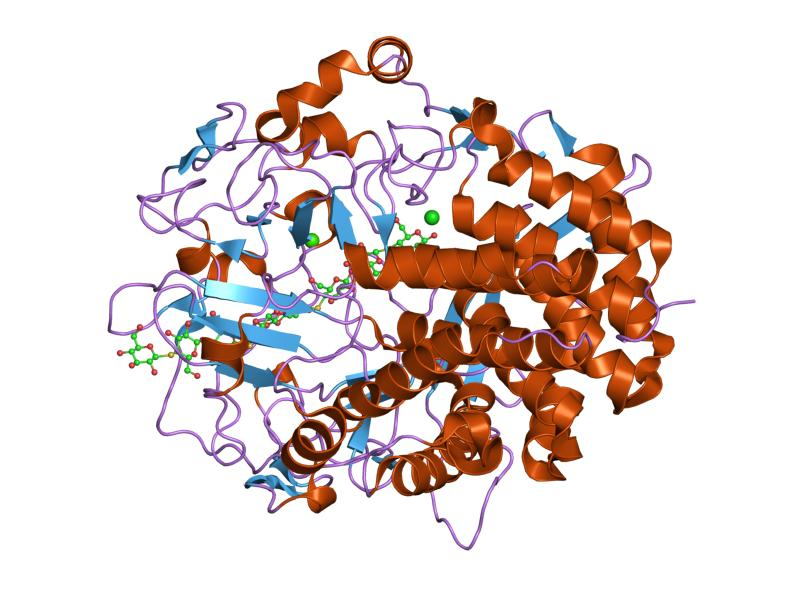
- x-tal structure of the mutant e44q of the cellulase cel48f in complex with a thiooligosaccharide

Identifiers
- Symbol: Glyco_hydro_48
- Pfam: PF02011
- Pfam clan: CL0059
- InterPro: IPR000556
- SCOP2: 1fce / SCOPe / SUPFAM
- CAZy: GH48
Available protein structures:
- PDB: IPR000556 PF02011 (ECOD; PDBsum)
- AlphaFold: IPR000556; PF02011

In molecular biology, glycoside hydrolase family 48 is a family of glycoside hydrolases.

Glycoside hydrolases EC 3.2.1. are a widespread group of enzymes that hydrolyse the glycosidic bond between two or more carbohydrates, or between a carbohydrate and a non-carbohydrate moiety. A classification system for glycoside hydrolases, based on sequence similarity, has led to the definition of >100 different families. This classification is available on the CAZy web site, and also discussed at CAZypedia, an online encyclopedia of carbohydrate active enzymes.

Glycoside hydrolase family 48 CAZY GH_48 comprises enzymes with several known activities; endoglucanase (EC 3.2.1.4); cellobiohydrolase (EC 3.2.1.91).

An example of an enzyme containing a domain belonging to this family is one of the cellulases (celA) from the genome of the thermophilic anaerobic bacterium Caldocellum saccharolyticum. The celA gene product is a polypeptide of 1751 amino acids; this has a multidomain structure comprising two catalytic domains and two cellulose-binding domains, linked by Pro-Thr-rich regions. The N-terminal domain encodes an endoglucanase activity on carboxymethylcellulose, consistent with its similarity to several endo-1, 4-beta-D-glucanase sequences, and is a member of the glycoside hydrolase family 9. The C-terminal domain belongs to this family shows similarity to a cellulase from Clostridium thermocellum (CelS), which acts synergistically with a second component to hydrolyse crystalline cellulose.
