= Glycoside hydrolase family 47 =

Glycosyl hydrolase family 47

Identifiers
- Symbol: Glyco_hydro_47
- Pfam: PF01532
- Pfam clan: CL0059
- SCOP2: 1dl2 / SCOPe / SUPFAM
- CAZy: GH47
- Membranome: 526
Available protein structures:
- PDB: PF01532 (ECOD; PDBsum)
- AlphaFold: PF01532

In molecular biology, glycoside hydrolase family 47 is a family of glycoside hydrolases.

Glycoside hydrolases EC 3.2.1. are a widespread group of enzymes that hydrolyse the glycosidic bond between two or more carbohydrates, or between a carbohydrate and a non-carbohydrate moiety. A classification system for glycoside hydrolases, based on sequence similarity, has led to the definition of >100 different families. This classification is available on the CAZy web site, and also discussed at CAZypedia, an online encyclopedia of carbohydrate active enzymes.

Glycoside hydrolase family 47 CAZY GH_47 comprises enzymes with only one known activity; alpha-mannosidase (EC 3.2.1.113).

Alpha-mannosidase is involved in the maturation of Asn-linked oligosaccharides. The enzyme hydrolyses terminal 1,2-linked alpha-D-mannose residues in the oligo-mannose oligosaccharide man(9)(glcnac)(2) in a calcium-dependent manner. The mannose residues are trimmed away to produce, first, man(8)glcnac(2), then a man(5)(glcnac)(2) structure.
