= Glycoside hydrolase family 12 =

Glycosyl hydrolase family 12
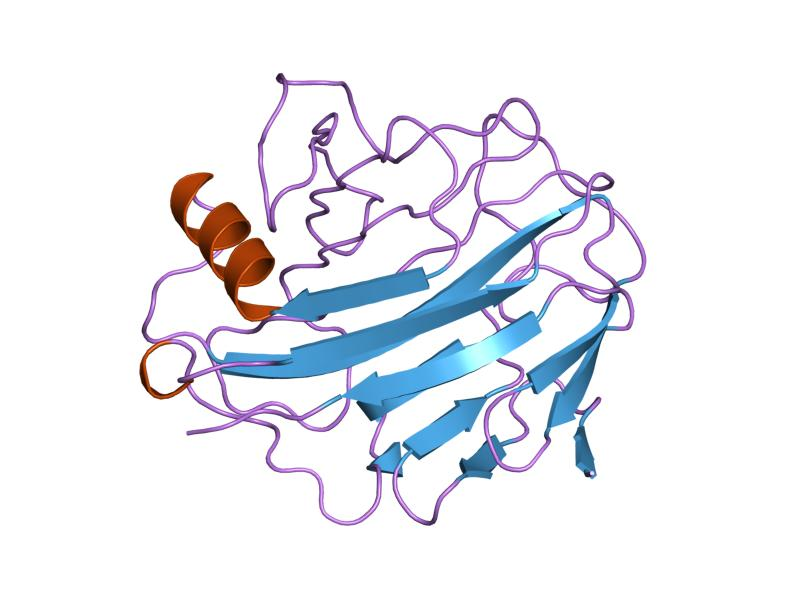
- comparison of family 12 glycoside hydrolases and recruited substitutions important for thermal stability

Identifiers
- Symbol: Glyco_hydro_12
- Pfam: PF01670
- Pfam clan: CL0004
- InterPro: IPR002594
- SCOP2: 1nlr / SCOPe / SUPFAM
- CAZy: GH12
Available protein structures:
- PDB: IPR002594 PF01670 (ECOD; PDBsum)
- AlphaFold: IPR002594; PF01670

In molecular biology, Glycoside hydrolase family 12 is a family of glycoside hydrolases.

Glycoside hydrolases EC 3.2.1. are a widespread group of enzymes that hydrolyse the glycosidic bond between two or more carbohydrates, or between a carbohydrate and a non-carbohydrate moiety. A classification system for glycoside hydrolases, based on sequence similarity, has led to the definition of >100 different families. This classification is available on the CAZy web site, and also discussed at CAZypedia, an online encyclopedia of carbohydrate active enzymes.

Glycoside hydrolase family 12 CAZY GH_12 comprises enzymes with the following activities: endoglucanase (EC 3.2.1.4), xyloglucan hydrolase (EC 3.2.1.151), β-1,3-1,4-glucanase (EC 3.2.1.73) and xyloglucan endotransglycosylase (EC 3.2.1.207). These enzymes were formerly known as cellulase family H.
