= Glycoside hydrolase family 9 =

Protein

Glycosyl hydrolase family 9

Identifiers
- Symbol: Glyco_hydro_9
- Pfam: PF00759
- Pfam clan: CL0059
- PROSITE: PDOC00511
- SCOP2: 1clc / SCOPe / SUPFAM
- CAZy: GH9
- Membranome: 1017
Available protein structures:
- PDB: PF00759 (ECOD; PDBsum)
- AlphaFold: PF00759

In molecular biology, glycoside hydrolase family 9 is a family of glycoside hydrolases.

Glycoside hydrolases EC 3.2.1. are a widespread group of enzymes that hydrolyse the glycosidic bond between two or more carbohydrates, or between a carbohydrate and a non-carbohydrate moiety. A classification system for glycoside hydrolases, based on sequence similarity, has led to the definition of >100 different families. This classification is available on the CAZy web site, and also discussed at CAZypedia, an online encyclopedia of carbohydrate active enzymes.

Glycoside hydrolase family 9 CAZY GH_9 comprises enzymes with several known activities including endoglucanase (EC 3.2.1.4) and cellobiohydrolase (EC 3.2.1.91). These enzymes were formerly known as cellulase family E. Cellulases (Endoglucanases) EC 3.2.1.4 catalyse the endohydrolysis of 1,4-beta-D-glucosidic linkages in cellulose. GH9 family members have also been found in green microalgae (Chlamydomonas, Gonium and Volvox) that show highest sequence identity to endogenous GH9 cellulases from invertebrate metazoans
