= Glycoside hydrolase family 46 =

Glyco_hydro_46
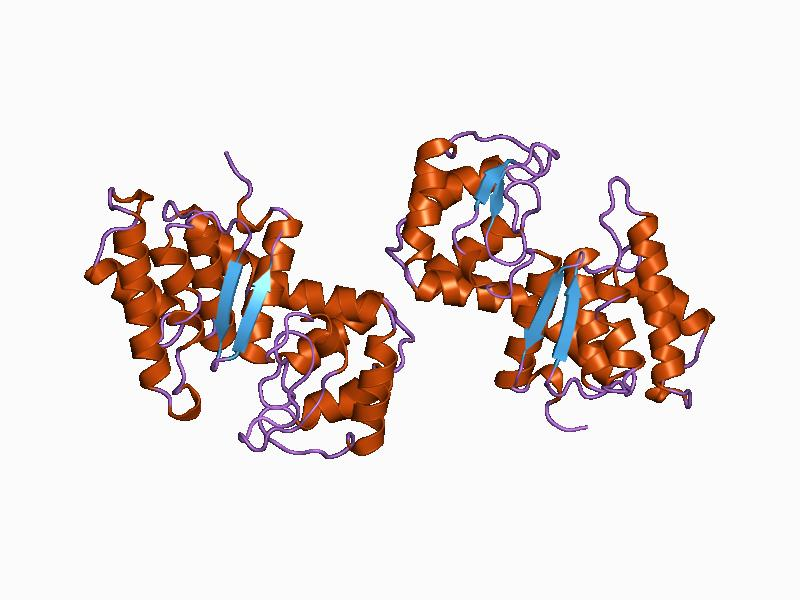
- streptomyces n174 chitosanase ph5.5 298k

Identifiers
- Symbol: Glyco_hydro_46
- Pfam: PF01374
- Pfam clan: CL0037
- InterPro: IPR000400
- SCOP2: 1chk / SCOPe / SUPFAM
- CAZy: GH46
Available protein structures:
- PDB: IPR000400 PF01374 (ECOD; PDBsum)
- AlphaFold: IPR000400; PF01374

In molecular biology, glycoside hydrolase family 46 is a family of glycoside hydrolases.

Glycoside hydrolases EC 3.2.1. are a widespread group of enzymes that hydrolyse the glycosidic bond between two or more carbohydrates, or between a carbohydrate and a non-carbohydrate moiety. A classification system for glycoside hydrolases, based on sequence similarity, has led to the definition of >100 different families. This classification is available on the CAZy web site, and also discussed at CAZypedia, an online encyclopedia of carbohydrate active enzymes.

Glycoside hydrolase family 46 CAZY GH_46 comprises enzymes with only one known activity; chitosanase (EC 3.2.1.132). Chitosanase enzymes catalyse the endohydrolysis of beta-1,4-linkages between N-acetyl-D-glucosamine and D-glucosamine residues in a partly acetylated chitosan.
