= Glycoside hydrolase family 62 =

Glycosyl hydrolase family 62

Identifiers
- Symbol: Glyco_hydro_62
- Pfam: PF03664
- Pfam clan: CL0143
- InterPro: IPR005193
- CAZy: GH62
Available protein structures:
- PDB: IPR005193 PF03664 (ECOD; PDBsum)
- AlphaFold: IPR005193; PF03664

In molecular biology, glycoside hydrolase family 62 is a family of glycoside hydrolases.

Glycoside hydrolases EC 3.2.1. are a widespread group of enzymes that hydrolyse the glycosidic bond between two or more carbohydrates, or between a carbohydrate and a non-carbohydrate moiety. A classification system for glycoside hydrolases, based on sequence similarity, has led to the definition of >100 different families. This classification is available on the CAZy web site, and also discussed at CAZypedia, an online encyclopedia of carbohydrate active enzymes.

This is a family of alpha-L-arabinofuranosidases (EC 3.2.1.55) (CAZY GH_62). These enzymes hydrolyze aryl alpha-L-arabinofuranosides and cleaves arabinosyl side chains from arabinoxylan and arabinan.
