= Glycoside hydrolase family 85 =

Glycosyl hydrolase family 85

Identifiers
- Symbol: Glyco_hydro_85
- Pfam: PF03644
- InterPro: IPR005201
- OPM superfamily: 351
- OPM protein: 2vtf
- CAZy: GH85
Available protein structures:
- PDB: IPR005201 PF03644 (ECOD; PDBsum)
- AlphaFold: IPR005201; PF03644

In molecular biology, glycoside hydrolase family 85 is a family of glycoside hydrolases.

Glycoside hydrolases EC 3.2.1. are a widespread group of enzymes that hydrolyse the glycosidic bond between two or more carbohydrates, or between a carbohydrate and a non-carbohydrate moiety. A classification system for glycoside hydrolases, based on sequence similarity, has led to the definition of >100 different families. This classification is available on the CAZy web site, and also discussed at CAZypedia, an online encyclopedia of carbohydrate active enzymes.

Glycoside hydrolase family 85 enzymes have endo-beta-N-acetylglucosaminidase activity EC 3.2.1.96 (CAZY GH_85). These enzymes work on a broad spectrum of substrates.
