= Glycoside hydrolase family 71 =

InterPro Family

Glycosyl hydrolase family 71

Identifiers
- Symbol: Glyco_hydro_71
- Pfam: PF03659
- InterPro: IPR005197
- CAZy: GH71
Available protein structures:
- PDB: IPR005197 PF03659 (ECOD; PDBsum)
- AlphaFold: IPR005197; PF03659

In molecular biology, glycoside hydrolase family 71 is a family of glycoside hydrolases.

Glycoside hydrolases EC 3.2.1. are a widespread group of enzymes that hydrolyse the glycosidic bond between two or more carbohydrates, or between a carbohydrate and a non-carbohydrate moiety. A classification system for glycoside hydrolases, based on sequence similarity, has led to the definition of >100 different families. This classification is available on the CAZy web site, and also discussed at CAZypedia, an online encyclopedia of carbohydrate active enzymes.

It is a family of alpha-1,3-glucanases (EC 3.2.1.59) (CAZY GH_71).
