= Glycoside hydrolase family 8 =

Glycosyl hydrolases family 8

Identifiers
- Symbol: Glyco_hydro_8
- Pfam: PF01270
- Pfam clan: CL0059
- PROSITE: PDOC00640
- SCOP2: 1cem / SCOPe / SUPFAM
- CAZy: GH8
Available protein structures:
- PDB: PF01270 (ECOD; PDBsum)
- AlphaFold: PF01270

In molecular biology, glycoside hydrolase family 8 is a family of glycoside hydrolases EC 3.2.1., which are a widespread group of enzymes that hydrolyse the glycosidic bond between two or more carbohydrates, or between a carbohydrate and a non-carbohydrate moiety. A classification system for glycoside hydrolases, based on sequence similarity, has led to the definition of >100 different families. This classification is available on the CAZy website, and also discussed at CAZypedia, an online encyclopedia of carbohydrate-active enzymes.

Glycoside hydrolase family 8 CAZY GH_8 comprises enzymes with several known activities; endoglucanase (EC 3.2.1.4); lichenase (EC 3.2.1.73); chitosanase (EC 3.2.1.132). These enzymes were formerly known as cellulase family D.
