= Glycoside hydrolase family 37 =

Group of enzymes

Trehalase

Identifiers
- Symbol: Trehalase
- Pfam: PF01204
- Pfam clan: CL0059
- InterPro: IPR001661
- PROSITE: PDOC00717
- CAZy: GH37
Available protein structures:
- PDB: IPR001661 PF01204 (ECOD; PDBsum)
- AlphaFold: IPR001661; PF01204

In molecular biology, glycoside hydrolase family 37 is a family of glycoside hydrolases.

Glycoside hydrolases EC 3.2.1. are a widespread group of enzymes that hydrolyse the glycosidic bond between two or more carbohydrates, or between a carbohydrate and a non-carbohydrate moiety. A classification system for glycoside hydrolases, based on sequence similarity, has led to the definition of >100 different families. This classification is available on the CAZy web site, and also discussed at CAZypedia, an online encyclopedia of carbohydrate active enzymes.

Glycoside hydrolase family 37 CAZY GH_37 comprises enzymes with only one known activity; trehalase (EC 3.2.1.28). Trehalase is the enzyme responsible for the degradation of the disaccharide alpha,alpha-trehalose yielding two glucose subunits. It is an enzyme found in a wide variety of organisms and whose sequence has been highly conserved throughout evolution.
