= Glycoside hydrolase family 49 =

Family of glycoside hydrolases

Glyco_hydro_49
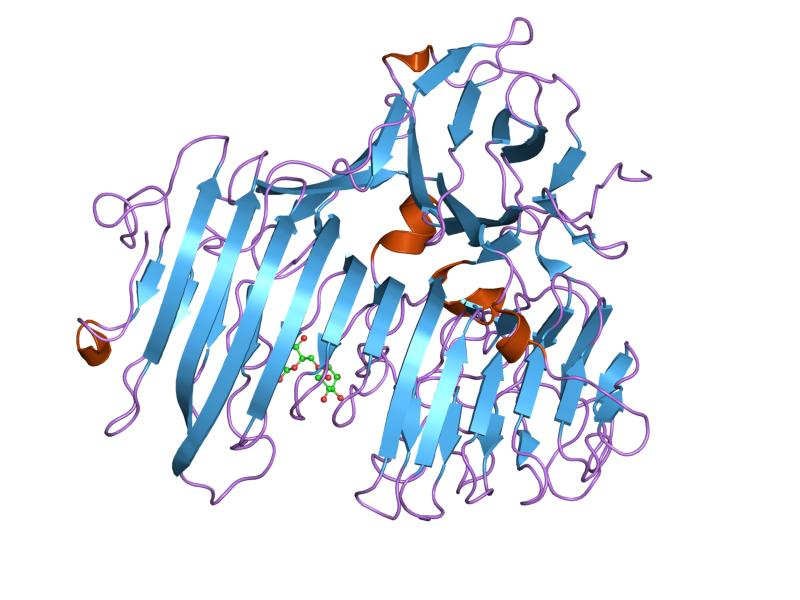
- dex49a from penicillium minioluteum complex with isomaltose

Identifiers
- Symbol: Glyco_hydro_49
- Pfam: PF03718
- Pfam clan: CL0268
- InterPro: IPR005192
- SCOP2: 1ogo / SCOPe / SUPFAM
- CAZy: GH49
Available protein structures:
- PDB: IPR005192 PF03718 (ECOD; PDBsum)
- AlphaFold: IPR005192; PF03718

In molecular biology, glycoside hydrolase family 49 is a family of glycoside hydrolases.

Glycoside hydrolases EC 3.2.1. are a widespread group of enzymes that hydrolyse the glycosidic bond between two or more carbohydrates, or between a carbohydrate and a non-carbohydrate moiety. A classification system for glycoside hydrolases, based on sequence similarity, has led to the definition of >100 different families. This classification is available on the CAZy web site, and also discussed at CAZypedia, an online encyclopedia of carbohydrate active enzymes.

Glycoside hydrolase family 49 is a family of dextranases and isopullulanases. Dextranase hydrolyses alpha-1,6-glycosidic bonds in dextran polymers.
