= Glycoside hydrolase family 26 =

Glycosyl hydrolase family 26

Identifiers
- Symbol: Glyco_hydro_26
- Pfam: PF02156
- Pfam clan: CL0058
- SCOP2: 1gvy / SCOPe / SUPFAM
- OPM superfamily: 117
- OPM protein: 2vi0
- CAZy: GH26
Available protein structures:
- PDB: PF02156 (ECOD; PDBsum)
- AlphaFold: PF02156

In molecular biology, glycoside hydrolase family 26 is a family of glycoside hydrolases.

Glycoside hydrolases EC 3.2.1. are a widespread group of enzymes that hydrolyse the glycosidic bond between two or more carbohydrates, or between a carbohydrate and a non-carbohydrate moiety. A classification system for glycoside hydrolases, based on sequence similarity, has led to the definition of >100 different families. This classification is available on the CAZy web site, and also discussed at CAZypedia, an online encyclopedia of carbohydrate active enzymes.

Glycoside hydrolase family 26 CAZY GH_26 comprises enzymes with two known activities; mannanase (EC 3.2.1.78) and β-1,3-xylanase (EC 3.2.1.32).

Family 26 encompasses mainly mannan endo-1,4-beta-mannosidases. Mannan endo-1,4-beta-mannosidase hydrolyses mannan and galactomannan, but displays little activity towards other plant cell wall polysaccharides. The enzyme randomly hydrolyses 1,4-beta-D-linkages in mannans, galacto-mannans, glucomannans and galactoglucomannans.
