= Glycoside hydrolase family 72 =

Glucanosyltransferase

Identifiers
- Symbol: Glyco_hydro_72
- Pfam: PF03198
- Pfam clan: CL0058
- InterPro: IPR004886
- OPM superfamily: 117
- OPM protein: 2w61
- CAZy: GH72
Available protein structures:
- PDB: IPR004886 PF03198 (ECOD; PDBsum)
- AlphaFold: IPR004886; PF03198

In molecular biology, glycoside hydrolase family 72 is a family of glycoside hydrolases.

Glycoside hydrolases EC 3.2.1. are a widespread group of enzymes that hydrolyse the glycosidic bond between two or more carbohydrates, or between a carbohydrate and a non-carbohydrate moiety. A classification system for glycoside hydrolases, based on sequence similarity, has led to the definition of >100 different families. This classification is available on the CAZy web site, and also discussed at CAZypedia, an online encyclopedia of carbohydrate active enzymes.

This family includes yeast glycolipid proteins anchored to the membrane. It includes Candida albicans pH-regulated protein, which is required for apical growth and plays a role in morphogenesis, and Saccharomyces cerevisiae glycolipid anchored surface protein.
