= Glycoside hydrolase family 77 =

Glyco_hydro_77
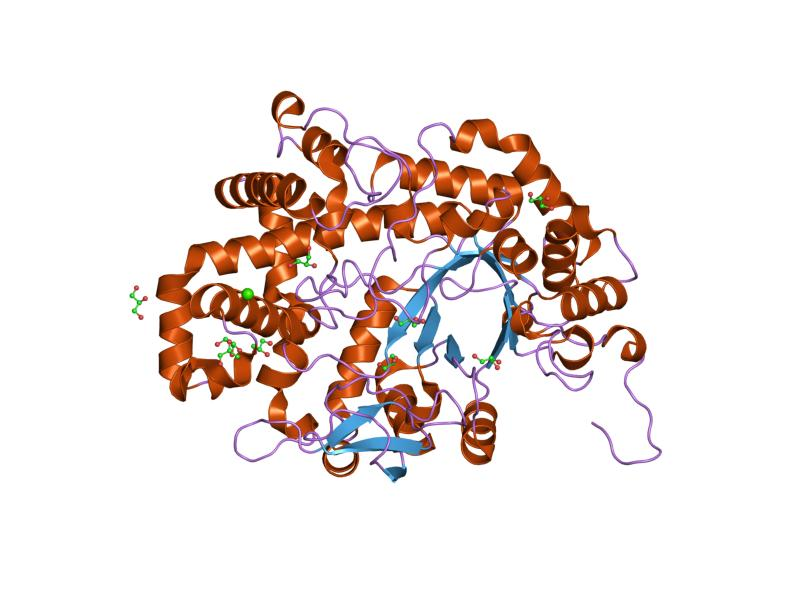
- structure determination and refinement at 1.8 a resolution of disproportionating enzyme from potato

Identifiers
- Symbol: Glyco_hydro_77
- Pfam: PF02446
- Pfam clan: CL0058
- InterPro: IPR003385
- SCOP2: 1cwy / SCOPe / SUPFAM
- CAZy: GH77
Available protein structures:
- PDB: IPR003385 PF02446 (ECOD; PDBsum)
- AlphaFold: IPR003385; PF02446

In molecular biology, glycoside hydrolase family 77 is a family of glycoside hydrolases.

Glycoside hydrolases EC 3.2.1. are a widespread group of enzymes that hydrolyse the glycosidic bond between two or more carbohydrates, or between a carbohydrate and a non-carbohydrate moiety. A classification system for glycoside hydrolases, based on sequence similarity, has led to the definition of >100 different families. This classification is available on the CAZy web site, and also discussed at CAZypedia, an online encyclopedia of carbohydrate active enzymes.

The enzymes in this family have amylomaltase or 4-α-glucanotransferase activity (EC 2.4.1.25) CAZY GH_77, they transfer a segment of a (1,4)-alpha-D-glucan to a new 4-position in an acceptor, which may be glucose or (1,4)-alpha-D-glucan. They belong to the disproportionating family of enzymes.
