= Glycoside hydrolase family 80 =

Glycosyl hydrolase family 80 of chitosanase A

Identifiers
- Symbol: Glyco_hydro_80
- Pfam: PF13647
- Pfam clan: CL0268
- CAZy: GH80
Available protein structures:
- PDB: PF13647 (ECOD; PDBsum)
- AlphaFold: PF13647

In molecular biology, glycoside hydrolase family 80 is a family of glycoside hydrolases.

Glycoside hydrolases EC 3.2.1. are a widespread group of enzymes that hydrolyse the glycosidic bond between two or more carbohydrates, or between a carbohydrate and a non-carbohydrate moiety. A classification system for glycoside hydrolases, based on sequence similarity, has led to the definition of >100 different families. This classification is available on the CAZy web site, and also discussed at CAZypedia, an online encyclopedia of carbohydrate active enzymes.

Glycoside hydrolase family 80 CAZY GH_80 includes enzymes with chitosanase EC 3.2.1.132 activity.
