= Glycoside hydrolase family 97 =

Glycoside hydrolase 97

Identifiers
- Symbol: Glyco_hydro_97
- Pfam: PF10566
- Pfam clan: CL0058
- InterPro: IPR019563
Available protein structures:
- PDB: IPR019563 PF10566 (ECOD; PDBsum)
- AlphaFold: IPR019563; PF10566

In molecular biology, glycoside hydrolase family 97 is a family of glycoside hydrolases.

Glycoside hydrolases EC 3.2.1. are a widespread group of enzymes that hydrolyse the glycosidic bond between two or more carbohydrates, or between a carbohydrate and a non-carbohydrate moiety. A classification system for glycoside hydrolases, based on sequence similarity, has led to the definition of >100 different families. This classification is available on the CAZy web site, and also discussed at CAZypedia, an online encyclopedia of carbohydrate active enzymes.

Glycoside hydrolase family 97 (GH97) is a bacterial family. The central part of the GH97 family protein sequences represents a typical and complete (beta/alpha)8-barrel or catalytic TIM-barrel type domain. The N- and C-terminal parts of the sequences, mainly consisting of beta-strands, most probably form two additional non-catalytic domains with as yet unknown functions. The non-catalytic domains of glycosidases from the alpha-galactosidase and alpha-glucosidase superfamilies are also predominantly composed of beta-strands, and at least some of these domains are involved in oligomerisation and carbohydrate binding. In all known glycosidases with the (beta-alpha)8-barrel fold, the amino acid residues at the active site are located on the C-termini of the beta-strands.
