= Glycoside hydrolase family 45 =

Glycosyl hydrolase family 45
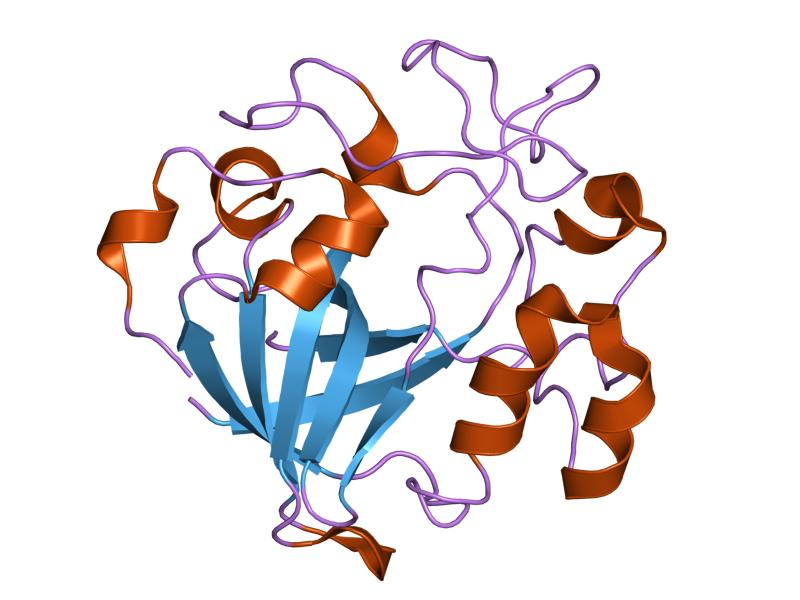
- endoglucanase from humicola insolens at 1.7a resolution

Identifiers
- Symbol: Glyco_hydro_45
- Pfam: PF02015
- Pfam clan: CL0199
- InterPro: IPR000334
- PROSITE: PDOC00877
- SCOP2: 2eng / SCOPe / SUPFAM
- CAZy: GH45
Available protein structures:
- PDB: IPR000334 PF02015 (ECOD; PDBsum)
- AlphaFold: IPR000334; PF02015

In molecular biology, glycoside hydrolase family 45 is a family of glycoside hydrolases.

Glycoside hydrolases EC 3.2.1. are a widespread group of enzymes that hydrolyse the glycosidic bond between two or more carbohydrates, or between a carbohydrate and a non-carbohydrate moiety. A classification system for glycoside hydrolases, based on sequence similarity, has led to the definition of >100 different families. This classification is available on the CAZy web site, and also discussed at CAZypedia, an online encyclopedia of carbohydrate active enzymes.

Glycoside hydrolase family 45 CAZY GH_45 comprises enzymes with only one known activity; endoglucanase (EC 3.2.1.4). This family is also known as cellulase family K. The best conserved region in these enzymes is located in the N-terminal section. It contains an aspartic acid residue which has been shown to act as a nucleophile in the catalytic mechanism. This also has several cysteines that are involved in forming disulphide bridges.
