= Glycoside hydrolase family 73 =

Glucosaminidase

Identifiers
- Symbol: Glucosaminidase
- Pfam: PF01832
- Pfam clan: CL0037
- InterPro: IPR002901
- CAZy: GH73
Available protein structures:
- PDB: IPR002901 PF01832 (ECOD; PDBsum)
- AlphaFold: IPR002901; PF01832

In molecular biology, glycoside hydrolase family 73 is a family of glycoside hydrolases.

Glycoside hydrolases EC 3.2.1. are a widespread group of enzymes that hydrolyse the glycosidic bond between two or more carbohydrates, or between a carbohydrate and a non-carbohydrate moiety. A classification system for glycoside hydrolases, based on sequence similarity, has led to the definition of >100 different families. This classification is available on the CAZy web site, and also discussed at CAZypedia, an online encyclopedia of carbohydrate active enzymes.

Glycoside hydrolase family 73 CAZY GH_73 includes peptidoglycan hydrolases with endo-β-N-acetylglucosaminidase specificity. Members of this family include mannosyl-glycoprotein endo-beta-N-acetylglucosamidase EC 3.2.1.96 and flagellar protein J (flgJ), which has been shown to hydrolyse peptidoglycan.
