= Glycoside hydrolase family 100 =

Alkaline and neutral invertase

Identifiers
- Symbol: Glyco_hydro_100
- Pfam: PF12899
- Pfam clan: CL0059
- CAZy: GH100
Available protein structures:
- PDB: PF12899 (ECOD; PDBsum)
- AlphaFold: PF12899

In molecular biology, glycoside hydrolase family 100 is a family of glycoside hydrolases.

Glycoside hydrolases EC 3.2.1. are a widespread group of enzymes that hydrolyse the glycosidic bond between two or more carbohydrates, or between a carbohydrate and a non-carbohydrate moiety. A classification system for glycoside hydrolases, based on sequence similarity, has led to the definition of >100 different families. This classification is available on the CAZy web site, and also discussed at CAZypedia, an online encyclopedia of carbohydrate active enzymes.

Glycoside hydrolase family 100 CAZY GH_100 includes enzymes with invertase activity EC 3.2.1.26.
