= Glycoside hydrolase family 16 =

Glycosyl hydrolase family 16
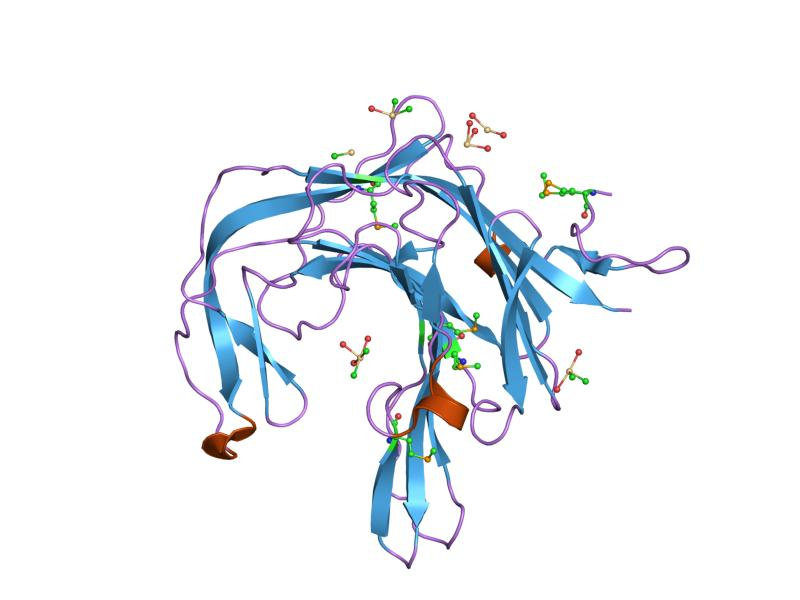
- 1,3-alpha-1,4-beta-d-galactose-4-sulfate-3,6-anhydro-d-galactose 4 galactohydrolase

Identifiers
- Symbol: Glyco_hydro_16
- Pfam: PF00722
- Pfam clan: CL0004
- InterPro: IPR000757
- PROSITE: PDOC00794
- SCOP2: 1cpn / SCOPe / SUPFAM
- CAZy: GH16
- CDD: cd00413
Available protein structures:
- PDB: IPR000757 PF00722 (ECOD; PDBsum)
- AlphaFold: IPR000757; PF00722

In molecular biology, Glycoside hydrolase family 16 is a family of glycoside hydrolases.

Glycoside hydrolases EC 3.2.1. are a widespread group of enzymes that hydrolyse the glycosidic bond between two or more carbohydrates, or between a carbohydrate and a non-carbohydrate moiety. A classification system for glycoside hydrolases, based on sequence similarity, has led to the definition of >100 different families. This classification is available on the CAZy web site, and also discussed at CAZypedia, an online encyclopedia of carbohydrate active enzymes. y[ _]9

Glycoside hydrolase family 16 CAZY GH_16 comprises enzymes with a number of known activities; lichenase (EC 3.2.1.73); xyloglucan xyloglucosyltransferase (EC 2.4.1.207); agarase (EC 3.2.1.81); kappa-carrageenase (EC 3.2.1.83); endo-beta-1,3-glucanase (EC 3.2.1.39); endo-beta-1,3-1,4-glucanase (EC 3.2.1.6); endo-beta-galactosidase (EC 3.2.1.103).
