= Glycoside hydrolase family 98 =

Glycosyl hydrolase family 98

Identifiers
- Symbol: Glyco_hydro_98M
- Pfam: PF08306
- InterPro: IPR013191
- CAZy: GH98
Available protein structures:
- PDB: IPR013191 PF08306 (ECOD; PDBsum)
- AlphaFold: IPR013191; PF08306

Glycosyl hydrolase family 98 C-terminal domain

Identifiers
- Symbol: Glyco_hydro_98C
- Pfam: PF08307
- InterPro: IPR013190
Available protein structures:
- PDB: IPR013190 PF08307 (ECOD; PDBsum)
- AlphaFold: IPR013190; PF08307

In molecular biology, glycoside hydrolase family 98 is a family of glycoside hydrolases.

Glycoside hydrolases EC 3.2.1. are a widespread group of enzymes that hydrolyse the glycosidic bond between two or more carbohydrates, or between a carbohydrate and a non-carbohydrate moiety. A classification system for glycoside hydrolases, based on sequence similarity, has led to the definition of >100 different families. This classification is available on the CAZy web site, and also discussed at CAZypedia, an online encyclopedia of carbohydrate active enzymes.

Members of glycoside hydrolase family 98 have endo-β-galactosidase activity. This family includes E-ABase from Clostridium perfringens which cleaves both blood group A and B glycotopes.

The putative catalytic domain is found to the N-terminus of a second domain, which is not expected to form part of the catalytic activity.
