= Glycoside hydrolase family 78 =

Bacterial alpha-L-rhamnosidase

Identifiers
- Symbol: Bac_rhamnosid
- Pfam: PF05592
- Pfam clan: CL0059
- InterPro: IPR008902
- CAZy: GH78
Available protein structures:
- PDB: IPR008902 PF05592 (ECOD; PDBsum)
- AlphaFold: IPR008902; PF05592

In molecular biology, glycoside hydrolase family 78 is a family of glycoside hydrolases.

Glycoside hydrolases EC 3.2.1. are a widespread group of enzymes that hydrolyse the glycosidic bond between two or more carbohydrates, or between a carbohydrate and a non-carbohydrate moiety. A classification system for glycoside hydrolases, based on sequence similarity, has led to the definition of >100 different families. This classification is available on the CAZy web site, and also discussed at CAZypedia, an online encyclopedia of carbohydrate active enzymes.

Glycoside hydrolase family 78 CAZY GH_78 includes enzymes with α-L-rhamnosidase EC 3.2.1.40 activity. This family includes bacterial rhamnosidase A and B enzymes. L-Rhamnose is abundant in biomass as a common constituent of glycolipids and glycosides, such as plant pigments, pectic polysaccharides, gums or biosurfactants. Some rhamnosides are important bioactive compounds. For example, terpenyl glycosides, the glycosidic precursor of aromatic terpenoids, act as important flavouring substances in grapes. Other rhamnosides act as cytotoxic rhamnosylated terpenoids, as signal substances in plants or play a role in the antigenicity of pathogenic bacteria.
