= Glycoside hydrolase family 70 =

Glycosyl hydrolase family 70

Identifiers
- Symbol: Glyco_hydro_70
- Pfam: PF02324
- Pfam clan: CL0058
- InterPro: IPR003318
- CAZy: GH70
Available protein structures:
- PDB: IPR003318 PF02324 (ECOD; PDBsum)
- AlphaFold: IPR003318; PF02324

In molecular biology, glycoside hydrolase family 70 is a family of glycoside hydrolases.

Glycoside hydrolases EC 3.2.1. are a widespread group of enzymes that hydrolyse the glycosidic bond between two or more carbohydrates, or between a carbohydrate and a non-carbohydrate moiety. A classification system for glycoside hydrolases, based on sequence similarity, has led to the definition of >100 different families. This classification is available on the CAZy web site, and also discussed at CAZypedia, an online encyclopedia of carbohydrate active enzymes.

This family includes glucosyltransferases or sucrose 6-glycosyl transferases (GTF-S) (EC 2.4.1.5CAZY GH_70) which catalyse the transfer of D-glucopyramnosyl units from sucrose onto acceptor molecules. Some members of this family contain a cell wall-binding repeat.
