= Beta-primeverosidase =

beta-primeverosidase

Identifiers
- EC no.: 3.2.1.149

Databases
- IntEnz: IntEnz view
- BRENDA: BRENDA entry
- ExPASy: NiceZyme view
- KEGG: KEGG entry
- MetaCyc: metabolic pathway
- PRIAM: profile
- PDB structures: RCSB PDB PDBe PDBsum
- Gene Ontology: AmiGO / QuickGO
Search
- PMC: articles
- PubMed: articles
- NCBI: proteins

In enzymology, a beta-primeverosidase (EC 3.2.1.149) is an enzyme that catalyzes the chemical reaction

a 6-O-(beta-D-xylopyranosyl)-beta-D-glucopyranoside + H_{2}O $\rightleftharpoons$ 6-O-(beta-D-xylopyranosyl)-beta-D-glucopyranose + an alcohol

Thus, the two substrates of this enzyme are 6-O-(beta-D-xylopyranosyl)-beta-D-glucopyranoside and H_{2}O, whereas its two products are 6-O-(beta-D-xylopyranosyl)-beta-D-glucopyranose and alcohol.

This enzyme belongs to the family of hydrolases, specifically those glycosidases that hydrolyse O- and S-glycosyl compounds. The systematic name of this enzyme class is 6-O-(beta-D-xylopyranosyl)-beta-D-glucopyranoside 6-O-(beta-D-xylosyl)-beta-D-glucohydrolase.
