= Glycoside hydrolase family 92 =

Glycosyl hydrolase family 92

Identifiers
- Symbol: Glyco_hydro_92
- Pfam: PF07971
- Pfam clan: CL0268
- InterPro: IPR012939
- CAZy: GH92
Available protein structures:
- PDB: IPR012939 PF07971 (ECOD; PDBsum)
- AlphaFold: IPR012939; PF07971

In molecular biology, glycoside hydrolase family 92 is a family of glycoside hydrolases.

Glycoside hydrolases EC 3.2.1. are a widespread group of enzymes that hydrolyse the glycosidic bond between two or more carbohydrates, or between a carbohydrate and a non-carbohydrate moiety. A classification system for glycoside hydrolases, based on sequence similarity, has led to the definition of >100 different families. This classification is available on the CAZy web site, and also discussed at CAZypedia, an online encyclopedia of carbohydrate active enzymes.

This domain occurs within alpha-1,2-mannosidases, which remove alpha-1,2-linked mannose residues from Man(9)(GlcNAc)(2) by hydrolysis. They are critical for the maturation of N-linked oligosaccharides and ER-associated degradation.

Glycoside hydrolase family 92 includes enzymes with mannosyl-oligosaccharide α-1,2-mannosidase EC 3.2.1.113, mannosyl-oligosaccharide α-1,3-mannosidase EC 3.2.1.-, mannosyl-oligosaccharide α-1,6-mannosidase EC 3.2.1.-, α-mannosidase EC 3.2.1.24, α-1,2-mannosidase EC 3.2.1.-, α-1,3-mannosidase EC 3.2.1.- and α-1,4-mannosidase EC 3.2.1.- activities. It includes enzymes critical for the maturation of N-linked oligosaccharides and ER-associated degradation.
