= Glycoside hydrolase family 52 =

Glyco_hydro_52

Identifiers
- Symbol: Glyco_hydro_52
- Pfam: PF03512
- InterPro: IPR000852
- CAZy: GH52
Available protein structures:
- PDB: IPR000852 PF03512 (ECOD; PDBsum)
- AlphaFold: IPR000852; PF03512

In molecular biology, glycoside hydrolase family 52 is a family of glycoside hydrolases.

Glycoside hydrolases EC 3.2.1. are a widespread group of enzymes that hydrolyse the glycosidic bond between two or more carbohydrates, or between a carbohydrate and a non-carbohydrate moiety. A classification system for glycoside hydrolases, based on sequence similarity, has led to the definition of >100 different families. This classification is available on the CAZy web site, and also discussed at CAZypedia, an online encyclopedia of carbohydrate active enzymes.

Glycoside hydrolase family 52 CAZY GH_52 comprises enzymes with only one known activity; beta-xylosidase (EC 3.2.1.37).

Proteins harboring beta-xylosidase and xylanase activities have been identified in the Gram-positive, facultative thermophilic aerobe Bacillus stearothermophilus 21. This microbe, which functions in xylan degradation, can utilise xylan as a sole source of carbon. The enzyme hydrolyses 1,4-beta-D-xylans, removing successive D-xylose residues from the non-reducing termini. It also hydrolyses xylobiose.
