= Glycoside hydrolase family 108 =

Glycosyl hydrolase 108

Identifiers
- Symbol: Glyco_hydro_108
- Pfam: PF05838
- Pfam clan: CL0037
- CAZy: GH108
Available protein structures:
- PDB: PF05838 (ECOD; PDBsum)
- AlphaFold: PF05838

In molecular biology, glycoside hydrolase family 108 is a family of glycoside hydrolases.

Glycoside hydrolases EC 3.2.1. are a widespread group of enzymes that hydrolyse the glycosidic bond between two or more carbohydrates, or between a carbohydrate and a non-carbohydrate moiety. A classification system for glycoside hydrolases, based on sequence similarity, has led to the definition of >100 different families. This classification is available on the CAZy web site, and also discussed at CAZypedia, an online encyclopedia of carbohydrate active enzymes.

Glycoside hydrolase family 108 CAZY GH_108 includes enzymes with lysozyme (N-acetylmuramidase) EC 3.2.1.17 activity. A glutamic acid residue within a conserved Glu-Gly-Gly-Tyr motif is essential for catalytic activity. In bacteria, it may activate the secretion of large proteins via the breaking and rearrangement of the peptidoglycan layer during secretion.
