= Glycoside hydrolase family 75 =

Fungal chitosanase of glycosyl hydrolase group 75

Identifiers
- Symbol: Glyco_hydro_75
- Pfam: PF07335
- CAZy: GH75
Available protein structures:
- PDB: PF07335 (ECOD; PDBsum)
- AlphaFold: PF07335

In molecular biology, glycoside hydrolase family 75 is a family of glycoside hydrolases.

Glycoside hydrolases EC 3.2.1. are a widespread group of enzymes that hydrolyse the glycosidic bond between two or more carbohydrates, or between a carbohydrate and a non-carbohydrate moiety. A classification system for glycoside hydrolases, based on sequence similarity, has led to the definition of >100 different families. This classification is available on the CAZy web site, and also discussed at CAZypedia, an online encyclopedia of carbohydrate active enzymes.

Glycoside hydrolase family 75 CAZY GH_75 includes enzymes with chitosanase EC 3.2.1.132 activity. This family includes several fungal chitosanase proteins. Chitin, xylan, 6-O-sulphated chitosan and O-carboxymethyl chitin are indigestible by chitosanase.
