= Glycoside hydrolase family 66 =

Family of Glycose Hydrolases

Glycosyl hydrolase family 66

Identifiers
- Symbol: Glyco_hydro_66
- Pfam: PF13199
- Pfam clan: CL0058
- CAZy: GH66
Available protein structures:
- PDB: PF13199 (ECOD; PDBsum)
- AlphaFold: PF13199

In molecular biology, glycoside hydrolase family 66 is a family of glycoside hydrolases.

Glycoside hydrolases EC 3.2.1. are a widespread group of enzymes that hydrolyse the glycosidic bond between two or more carbohydrates, or between a carbohydrate and a non-carbohydrate moiety. A classification system for glycoside hydrolases, based on sequence similarity, has led to the definition of >100 different families. This classification is available on the CAZy web site, and also discussed at CAZypedia, an online encyclopedia of carbohydrate active enzymes.

Glycoside hydrolase family 66 CAZY GH_66 includes enzymes with cycloisomaltooligosaccharide glucanotransferase EC 2.4.1.248 and dextranase EC 3.2.1.11 activities.
