= Glycoside hydrolase family 39 =

Family of glycoside hydrolases

Glycosyl hydrolases family 39
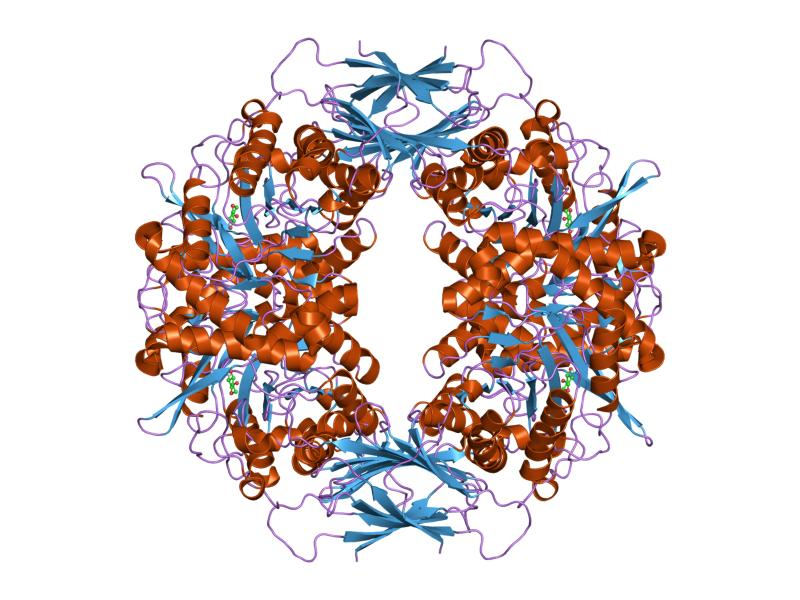
- crystal structure of beta-d-xylosidase from thermoanaerobacterium saccharolyticum, a family 39 glycoside hydrolase

Identifiers
- Symbol: Glyco_hydro_39
- Pfam: PF01229
- Pfam clan: CL0058
- InterPro: IPR000514
- PROSITE: PDOC00787
- SCOP2: 1uhv / SCOPe / SUPFAM
- CAZy: GH39
Available protein structures:
- PDB: IPR000514 PF01229 (ECOD; PDBsum)
- AlphaFold: IPR000514; PF01229

In molecular biology, glycoside hydrolase family 39 is a family of glycoside hydrolases.

Glycoside hydrolases EC 3.2.1. are a widespread group of enzymes that hydrolyse the glycosidic bond between two or more carbohydrates, or between a carbohydrate and a non-carbohydrate moiety. A classification system for glycoside hydrolases, based on sequence similarity, has led to the definition of >100 different families. This classification is available on the CAZy web site, and also discussed at CAZypedia, an online encyclopedia of carbohydrate active enzymes.

Glycoside hydrolase family 39 CAZY GH_39 comprises enzymes with several known activities; alpha-L-iduronidase (EC 3.2.1.76); beta-xylosidase (EC 3.2.1.37).

The most highly conserved regions in these enzymes are located in their N-terminal sections. These contain a glutamic acid residue which, on the basis of similarities with other families of glycosyl hydrolases, probably acts as the proton donor in their catalytic mechanism.
