= Glycoside hydrolase family 81 =

Glycosyl hydrolase family 81

Identifiers
- Symbol: Glyco_hydro_81
- Pfam: PF03639
- InterPro: IPR005200
- CAZy: GH81
Available protein structures:
- PDB: IPR005200 PF03639 (ECOD; PDBsum)
- AlphaFold: IPR005200; PF03639

In molecular biology, glycoside hydrolase family 81 is a family of glycoside hydrolases.

Glycoside hydrolases EC 3.2.1. are a widespread group of enzymes that hydrolyse the glycosidic bond between two or more carbohydrates, or between a carbohydrate and a non-carbohydrate moiety. A classification system for glycoside hydrolases, based on sequence similarity, has led to the definition of >100 different families. This classification is available on the CAZy web site, and also discussed at CAZypedia, an online encyclopedia of carbohydrate active enzymes.

Glycoside hydrolase family 81 is a family of eukaryotic beta-1,3-glucanases EC 3.2.1.39 (CAZY GH_81).
