= Glycoside hydrolase family 68 =

Levansucrase/Invertase
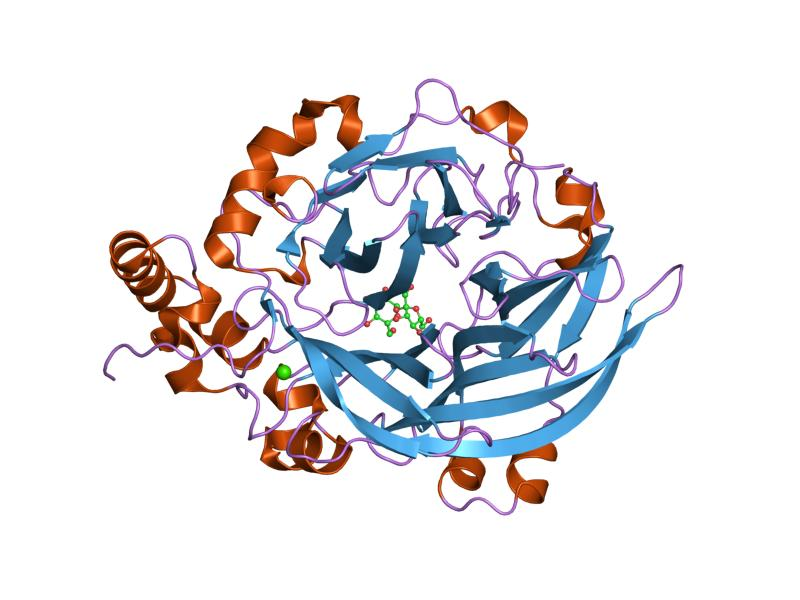
- crystal structure of levansucrase (e342a) complexed with sucrose

Identifiers
- Symbol: Glyco_hydro_68
- Pfam: PF02435
- Pfam clan: CL0143
- InterPro: IPR003469
- SCOP2: 1oyg / SCOPe / SUPFAM
- CAZy: GH68
Available protein structures:
- PDB: IPR003469 PF02435 (ECOD; PDBsum)
- AlphaFold: IPR003469; PF02435

In molecular biology, glycoside hydrolase family 68 is a family of glycoside hydrolases.

Glycoside hydrolases EC 3.2.1. are a widespread group of enzymes that hydrolyse the glycosidic bond between two or more carbohydrates, or between a carbohydrate and a non-carbohydrate moiety. A classification system for glycoside hydrolases, based on sequence similarity, has led to the definition of >100 different families. This classification is available on the CAZy web site, and also discussed at CAZypedia, an online encyclopedia of carbohydrate active enzymes.

The glycosyl hydrolase 68 family (CAZY GH_68) includes several bacterial levansucrase enzymes, and invertase from Zymomonas. Levansucrase (EC 2.4.1.10), also known as beta-D-fructofuranosyl transferase, catalyses the conversion of sucrose and (2,6-beta-D-fructosyl)(N) to glucose and (2,6-beta-D-fructosyl)(N+1), where other sugars can also act as fructosyl acceptors. Invertase, or extracellular sucrase (EC 3.2.1.26), catalyses the hydrolysis of terminal non-reducing beta-D-fructofuranoside residues in beta-D-fructofuranosides.
