= Glycoside hydrolase family 10 =

Glycoside hydrolase, family 10
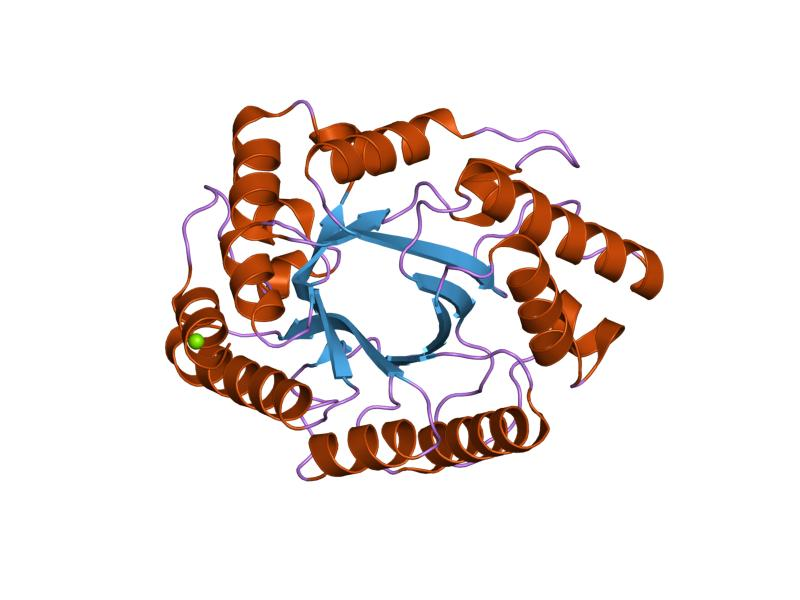
- crystal structure of the catalytic domain of xylanase a from streptomyces halstedii jm8

Identifiers
- Symbol: Glyco_hydro_10
- Pfam: PF00331
- Pfam clan: CL0058
- InterPro: IPR001000
- PROSITE: PDOC00510
- SCOP2: 2exo / SCOPe / SUPFAM
- CAZy: GH10
Available protein structures:
- PDB: IPR001000 PF00331 (ECOD; PDBsum)
- AlphaFold: IPR001000; PF00331

In molecular biology, Glycoside hydrolase family 10 is a family of glycoside hydrolases.

Glycoside hydrolases EC 3.2.1. are a widespread group of enzymes that hydrolyse the glycosidic bond between two or more carbohydrates, or between a carbohydrate and a non-carbohydrate moiety. A classification system for glycoside hydrolases, based on sequence similarity, has led to the definition of >100 different families. This classification is available on the CAZy web site, and also discussed at CAZypedia, an online encyclopedia of carbohydrate active enzymes.

Glycoside hydrolase family 10 CAZY GH_10 comprises enzymes with a number of known activities; xylanase (EC 3.2.1.8); endo-1,3-beta-xylanase (EC 3.2.1.32); cellobiohydrolase (EC 3.2.1.91). These enzymes were formerly known as cellulase family F.

The microbial degradation of cellulose and xylans requires several types of enzymes such as endoglucanases (EC 3.2.1.4), cellobiohydrolases (EC 3.2.1.91) (exoglucanases), or xylanases (EC 3.2.1.8). Fungi and bacteria produces a spectrum of cellulolytic enzymes (cellulases) and xylanases which, on the basis of sequence similarities, can be classified into families. One of these families is known as the cellulase family F or as the glycosyl hydrolases family 10.
