= Glycoside hydrolase family 59 =

Glycosyl hydrolase family 59

Identifiers
- Symbol: Glyco_hydro_59
- Pfam: PF02057
- Pfam clan: CL0058
- InterPro: IPR001286
- OPM superfamily: 117
- OPM protein: 3zr5
- CAZy: GH59
Available protein structures:
- PDB: IPR001286 PF02057 (ECOD; PDBsum)
- AlphaFold: IPR001286; PF02057

In molecular biology, glycoside hydrolase family 59 is a family of glycoside hydrolases.

Glycoside hydrolases EC 3.2.1. are a widespread group of enzymes that hydrolyse the glycosidic bond between two or more carbohydrates, or between a carbohydrate and a non-carbohydrate moiety. A classification system for glycoside hydrolases, based on sequence similarity, has led to the definition of >100 different families. This classification is available on the CAZy web site, and also discussed at CAZypedia, an online encyclopedia of carbohydrate active enzymes.

Glycoside hydrolase family 59 CAZY GH_59 comprises enzymes with only one known activity; galactocerebrosidase (EC 3.2.1.46). Globoid cell leukodystrophy (Krabbe disease) is a severe, autosomal recessive disorder that results from deficiency of galactocerebrosidase (GALC) activity. GALC is responsible for the lysosomal catabolism of certain galactolipids, including galactosylceramide and psychosine.
