= Glycoside hydrolase family 25 =

Glycosyl hydrolases family 25
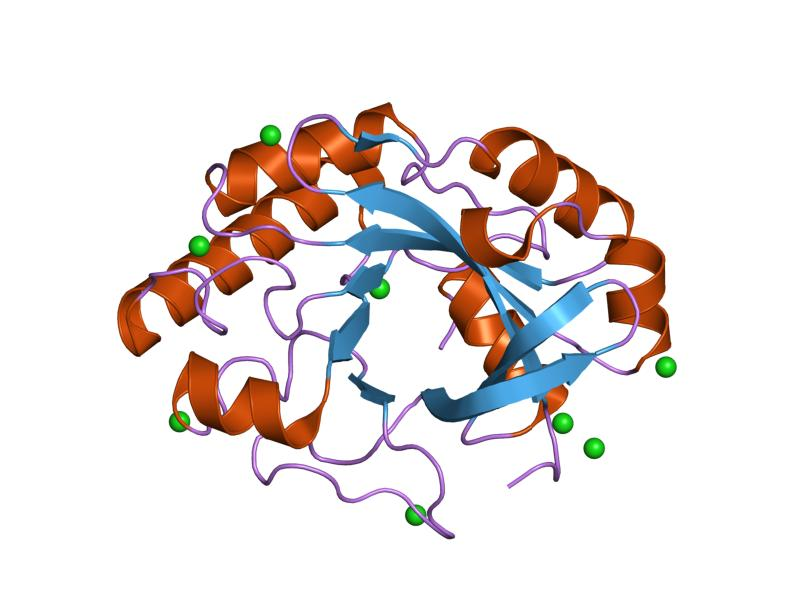
- crystal structure of the bacterial lysozyme from streptomyces coelicolor at 1.65 a resolution

Identifiers
- Symbol: Glyco_hydro_25
- Pfam: PF01183
- Pfam clan: CL0058
- InterPro: IPR002053
- PROSITE: PDOC00737
- SCOP2: 1jfx / SCOPe / SUPFAM
- CAZy: GH25
Available protein structures:
- PDB: IPR002053 PF01183 (ECOD; PDBsum)
- AlphaFold: IPR002053; PF01183

In molecular biology, glycoside hydrolase family 25 is a family of glycoside hydrolases.

Glycoside hydrolases EC 3.2.1. are a widespread group of enzymes that hydrolyse the glycosidic bond between two or more carbohydrates, or between a carbohydrate and a non-carbohydrate moiety. A classification system for glycoside hydrolases, based on sequence similarity, has led to the definition of >100 different families. This classification is available on the CAZy web site, and also discussed at CAZypedia, an online encyclopedia of carbohydrate active enzymes.

Glycoside hydrolase family 25 CAZY GH_25 comprises enzymes with only one known activity; lysozyme (EC 3.2.1.17). It has been shown that a number of cell-wall lytic enzymes are evolutionary related and can be classified into a single family. Two residues, an aspartate and a glutamate, have been shown to be important for the catalytic activity of the Charalopsis enzyme. These residues as well as some others in their vicinity are conserved in all proteins from this family.
