= Glycoside hydrolase family 44 =

Identifiers
- Symbol: Glyco_hydro_44
- Pfam: PF12891
- Pfam clan: CL0058
- CAZy: GH44
Available protein structures:
- PDB: PF12891 (ECOD; PDBsum)
- AlphaFold: PF12891

In molecular biology, glycoside hydrolase family 44 is a family of glycoside hydrolases.

Glycoside hydrolases EC 3.2.1. are a widespread group of enzymes that hydrolyse the glycosidic bond between two or more carbohydrates, or between a carbohydrate and a non-carbohydrate moiety. A classification system for glycoside hydrolases, based on sequence similarity, has led to the definition of >100 different families. This classification is available on the CAZy web site, and also discussed at CAZypedia, an online encyclopedia of carbohydrate active enzymes.

Glycoside hydrolase family 44 CAZY GH_44, formerly known as cellulase family J, includes enzymes with endoglucanase EC 3.2.1.4 and xyloglucanase EC 3.2.1.151 activities. The overall structure of enzymes in this family consists of a TIM-like barrel domain, a beta-sandwich domain and an active site with two glutamic acid residues, all of which are conserved between the endoglucanases and xyloglucanases in the family, with only minor differences.
