= Glycoside hydrolase family 67 =

Glycosyl hydrolase family 67 N-terminus
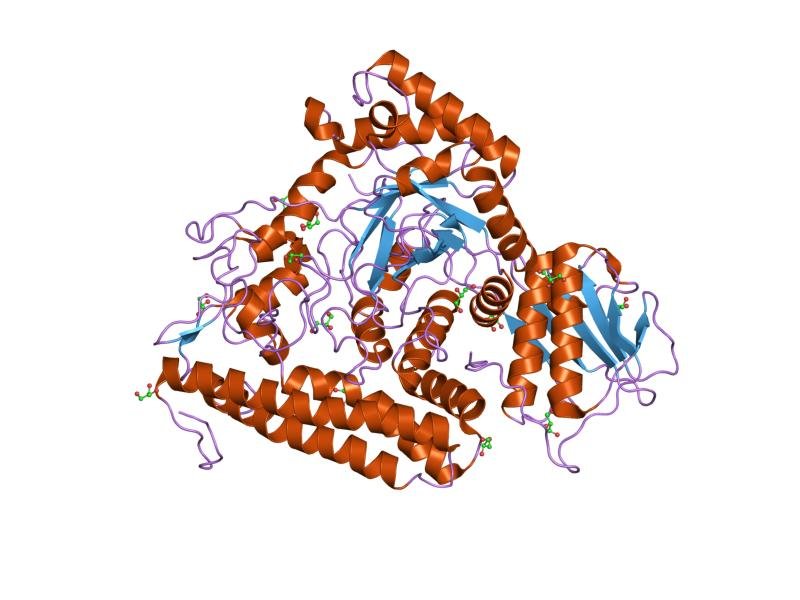
- the 1.7 a crystal structure of alpha-d-glucuronidase, a family-67 glycoside hydrolase from bacillus stearothermophilus t-1

Identifiers
- Symbol: Glyco_hydro_67N
- Pfam: PF03648
- InterPro: IPR005154
- SCOP2: 1h41 / SCOPe / SUPFAM
- CAZy: GH67
Available protein structures:
- PDB: IPR005154 PF03648 (ECOD; PDBsum)
- AlphaFold: IPR005154; PF03648

Glycosyl hydrolase family 67 middle domain
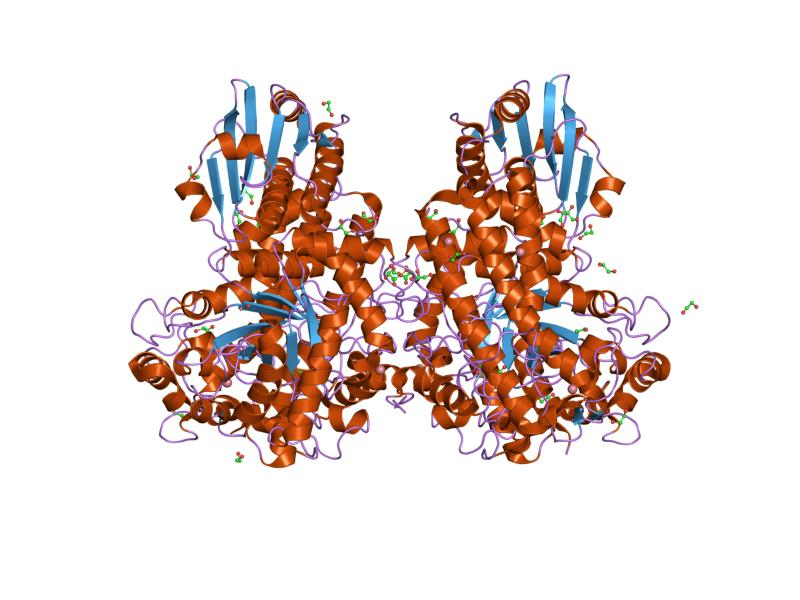
- pseudomonas cellulosa e292a alpha-d-glucuronidase mutant complexed with aldotriuronic acid

Identifiers
- Symbol: Glyco_hydro_67M
- Pfam: PF07488
- InterPro: IPR011100
- SCOP2: 1h41 / SCOPe / SUPFAM
- CAZy: GH67
Available protein structures:
- PDB: IPR011100 PF07488 (ECOD; PDBsum)
- AlphaFold: IPR011100; PF07488

Glycosyl hydrolase family 67 C-terminus
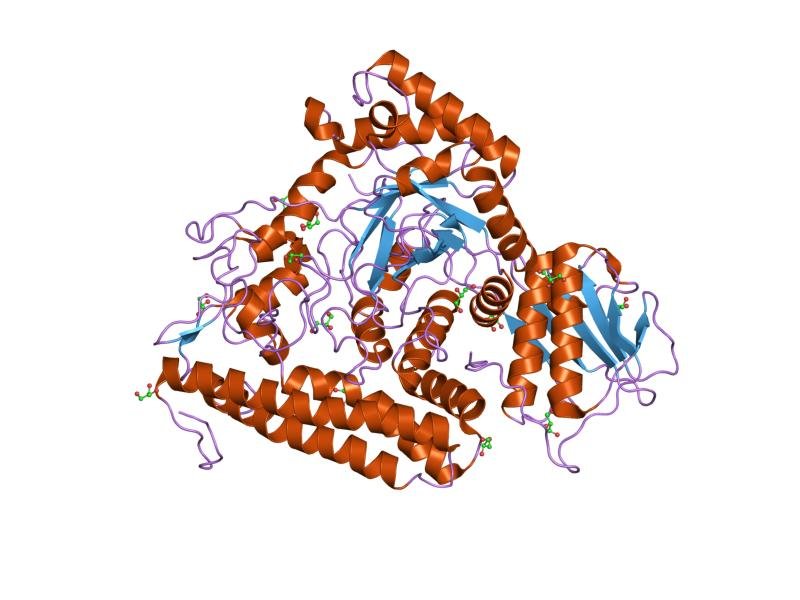
- the 1.7 a crystal structure of alpha-d-glucuronidase, a family-67 glycoside hydrolase from bacillus stearothermophilus t-1

Identifiers
- Symbol: Glyco_hydro_67C
- Pfam: PF07477
- InterPro: IPR011099
- SCOP2: 1h41 / SCOPe / SUPFAM
- CAZy: GH67
Available protein structures:
- PDB: IPR011099 PF07477 (ECOD; PDBsum)
- AlphaFold: IPR011099; PF07477

In molecular biology, glycoside hydrolase family 67 is a family of glycoside hydrolases.

Glycoside hydrolases EC 3.2.1. are a widespread group of enzymes that hydrolyse the glycosidic bond between two or more carbohydrates, or between a carbohydrate and a non-carbohydrate moiety. A classification system for glycoside hydrolases, based on sequence similarity, has led to the definition of >100 different families. This classification is available on the CAZy web site, and also discussed at CAZypedia, an online encyclopedia of carbohydrate active enzymes.

Glycoside hydrolase family 67 includes alpha-glucuronidases, these are components of an ensemble of enzymes central to the recycling of photosynthetic biomass, remove the alpha-1,2 linked 4-O-methyl glucuronic acid from xylans.

Members of this family consist of three structural domains. Deletion mutants of alpha-glucuronidase from Bacillus stearothermophilus have indicated that the central region is responsible for the catalytic activity. Within this central domain, the invariant Glu and Asp (residues 391 and 364 respectively from Bacillus stearothermophilus) are thought to form the catalytic centre. The C-terminal region of alpha-glucuronidase is mainly alpha-helical. It wraps around the catalytic domain, making additional interactions both with the N-terminal domain of its parent monomer and also forming the majority of the dimer-surface with the equivalent C-terminal domain of the other monomer of the dimer.
