= Glycoside hydrolase family 3 =

Glycosyl hydrolase family 3 N terminal domain

Identifiers
- Symbol: Glyco_hydro_3
- Pfam: PF00933
- Pfam clan: CL0058
- InterPro: IPR001764
- PROSITE: PDOC00621
- SCOP2: 1ex1 / SCOPe / SUPFAM
- CAZy: GH3
Available protein structures:
- PDB: IPR001764 PF00933 (ECOD; PDBsum)
- AlphaFold: IPR001764; PF00933

Glycosyl hydrolase family 3 C-terminal domain
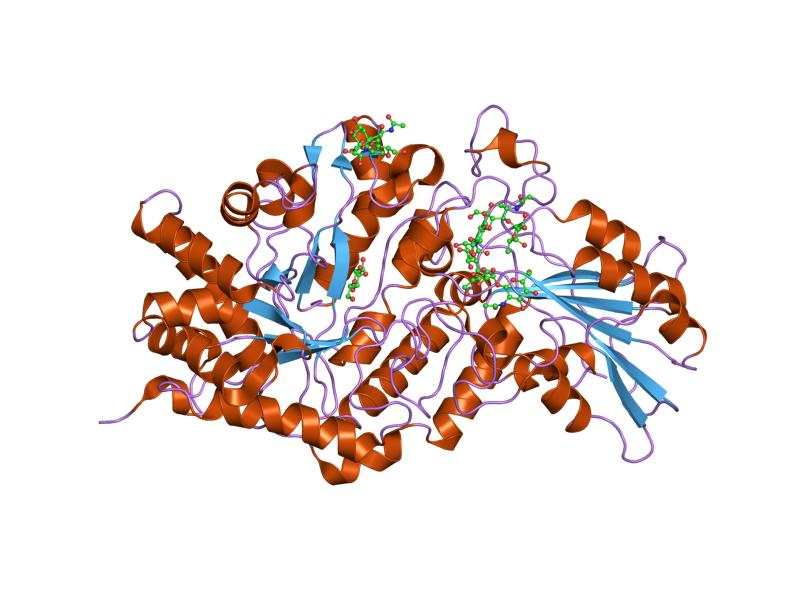
- crystal structure of barley beta-d-glucan glucohydrolase isoenzyme exo1

Identifiers
- Symbol: Glyco_hydro_3_C
- Pfam: PF01915
- InterPro: IPR002772
- PROSITE: PDOC00621
- SCOP2: 1ex1 / SCOPe / SUPFAM
Available protein structures:
- PDB: IPR002772 PF01915 (ECOD; PDBsum)
- AlphaFold: IPR002772; PF01915

In molecular biology, glycoside hydrolase family 3 is a family of glycoside hydrolases. Glycoside hydrolases EC 3.2.1. are a widespread group of enzymes that hydrolyse the glycosidic bond between two or more carbohydrates, or between a carbohydrate and a non-carbohydrate moiety. A classification system for glycoside hydrolases, based on sequence similarity, has led to the definition of over 100 different families. This classification is available on the CAZy web site, and also discussed at CAZypedia, an online encyclopedia of carbohydrate active enzymes.

Glycoside hydrolase family 3 CAZY GH_3 comprises enzymes with a number of known activities; beta-glucosidase (EC 3.2.1.21); beta-xylosidase (EC 3.2.1.37); N-acetyl beta-glucosaminidase (EC 3.2.1.52); glucan beta-1,3-glucosidase (EC 3.2.1.58); cellodextrinase (EC 3.2.1.74); exo-1,3-1,4-glucanase (EC 3.2.1). These enzymes are two-domain globular proteins that are N-glycosylated at three sites.
