= Glycoside hydrolase family 15 =

Glycosyl hydrolases family 15

Identifiers
- Symbol: Glyco_hydro_15
- Pfam: PF00723
- Pfam clan: CL0059
- SCOP2: 1glm / SCOPe / SUPFAM
- CAZy: GH15
Available protein structures:
- PDB: PF00723 (ECOD; PDBsum)
- AlphaFold: PF00723

In molecular biology, glycoside hydrolase family 15 is a family of glycoside hydrolases.

Glycoside hydrolases EC 3.2.1. are a widespread group of enzymes that hydrolyse the glycosidic bond between two or more carbohydrates, or between a carbohydrate and a non-carbohydrate moiety. A classification system for glycoside hydrolases, based on sequence similarity, has led to the definition of >100 different families. This classification is available on the CAZy web site, and also discussed at CAZypedia, an online encyclopedia of carbohydrate active enzymes.

Glycoside hydrolase family 15 CAZY GH_15 comprises enzymes with several known activities; glucoamylase (EC 3.2.1.3); alpha-glucosidase (EC 3.2.1.20); glucodextranase (EC 3.2.1.70).

Glucoamylase (GA) catalyses the release of D-glucose from the non-reducing ends of starch and other oligo- or poly-saccharides. Studies of fungal GA have indicated 3 closely clustered acidic residues that play a role in the catalytic mechanism. This region is also conserved in a recently sequenced bacterial GA.

The 3D structure of the pseudo-tetrasaccharide acarbose complexed with glucoamylase II(471) from Aspergillus awamori var. X100 has been determined to 2.4A resolution. The protein belongs to the mainly alpha class, and contains 19 helices and 9 strands.
