= Glycoside hydrolase family 65 =

Glycosyl hydrolase family 65, N-terminal domain
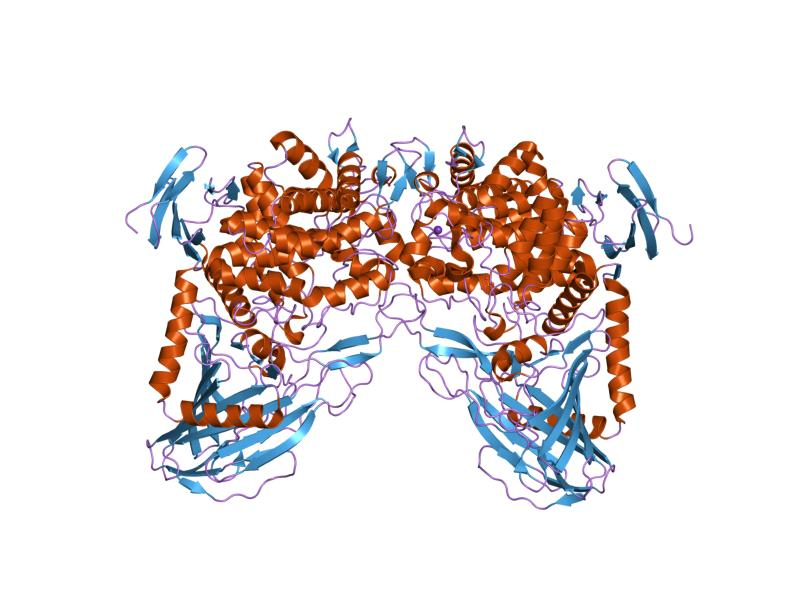
- maltose phosphorylase from lactobacillus brevis

Identifiers
- Symbol: Glyco_hydro_65N
- Pfam: PF03636
- Pfam clan: CL0103
- InterPro: IPR005196
- SCOP2: 1h54 / SCOPe / SUPFAM
- CAZy: GH65
Available protein structures:
- PDB: IPR005196 PF03636 (ECOD; PDBsum)
- AlphaFold: IPR005196; PF03636

Glycosyl hydrolase family 65 central catalytic domain
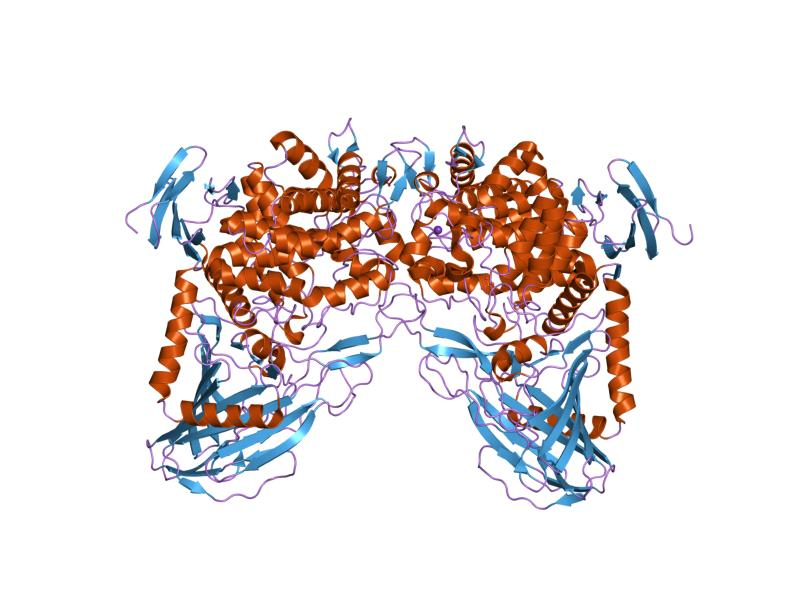
- maltose phosphorylase from lactobacillus brevis

Identifiers
- Symbol: Glyco_hydro_65m
- Pfam: PF03632
- Pfam clan: CL0059
- InterPro: IPR005195
- SCOP2: 1h54 / SCOPe / SUPFAM
- CAZy: GH65
Available protein structures:
- PDB: IPR005195 PF03632 (ECOD; PDBsum)
- AlphaFold: IPR005195; PF03632

Glycosyl hydrolase family 65, C-terminal domain
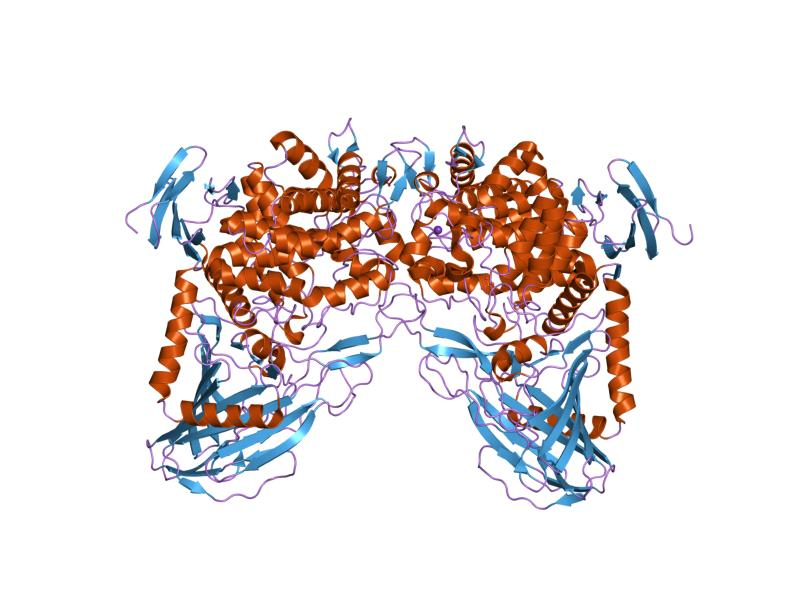
- maltose phosphorylase from lactobacillus brevis

Identifiers
- Symbol: Glyco_hydro_65C
- Pfam: PF03633
- InterPro: IPR005194
- SCOP2: 1h54 / SCOPe / SUPFAM
- CAZy: GH65
Available protein structures:
- PDB: IPR005194 PF03633 (ECOD; PDBsum)
- AlphaFold: IPR005194; PF03633

In molecular biology, glycoside hydrolase family 65 is a family of glycoside hydrolases.

Glycoside hydrolases EC 3.2.1. are a widespread group of enzymes that hydrolyse the glycosidic bond between two or more carbohydrates, or between a carbohydrate and a non-carbohydrate moiety. A classification system for glycoside hydrolases, based on sequence similarity, has led to the definition of >100 different families. This classification is available on the CAZy web site, and also discussed at CAZypedia, an online encyclopedia of carbohydrate active enzymes.

This family of glycosyl hydrolases (CAZY GH_65) includes vacuolar acid trehalase and maltose phosphorylases. Maltose phosphorylase (MP) is a dimeric enzyme that catalyzes the conversion of maltose and inorganic phosphate into beta-D-glucose-1-phosphate and glucose.

It consists of three structural domains. The C-terminal domain forms a two layered jelly roll motif. This domain is situated at the base of the catalytic domain, however its function remains unknown. The central domain is the catalytic domain, which binds a phosphate ion that is proximal the highly conserved Glu. The arrangement of the phosphate and the glutamate is thought to cause nucleophilic attack on the anomeric carbon atom. The catalytic domain also forms the majority of the dimerisation interface. The N-terminal domain is believed to be essential for catalytic activity although its precise function remains unknown.
