= Glycoside hydrolase family 88 =

Glycosyl Hydrolase Family 88

Identifiers
- Symbol: Glyco_hydro_88
- Pfam: PF07470
- Pfam clan: CL0059
- SCOP2: 1nc5 / SCOPe / SUPFAM
- CAZy: GH88
Available protein structures:
- PDB: PF07470 (ECOD; PDBsum)
- AlphaFold: PF07470

In molecular biology, glycoside hydrolase family 88 is a family of glycoside hydrolases.

Glycoside hydrolases EC 3.2.1. are a widespread group of enzymes that hydrolyse the glycosidic bond between two or more carbohydrates, or between a carbohydrate and a non-carbohydrate moiety. A classification system for glycoside hydrolases, based on sequence similarity, has led to the definition of >100 different families. This classification is available on the CAZy web site, and also discussed at CAZypedia, an online encyclopedia of carbohydrate active enzymes.

Glycoside hydrolase family 88 CAZY GH_88 includes enzymes with d-4,5 unsaturated β-glucuronyl hydrolase activity.
