= Glycoside hydrolase family 6 =

Glycosyl hydrolases family 6

Identifiers
- Symbol: Glyco_hydro_6
- Pfam: PF01341
- InterPro: IPR001524
- SCOP2: 1cb2 / SCOPe / SUPFAM
- CAZy: GH6
Available protein structures:
- PDB: IPR001524 PF01341 (ECOD; PDBsum)
- AlphaFold: IPR001524; PF01341

In molecular biology, glycoside hydrolase family 6 is a family of glycoside hydrolases EC 3.2.1., which are a widespread group of enzymes that hydrolyse the glycosidic bond between two or more carbohydrates, or between a carbohydrate and a non-carbohydrate moiety. A classification system for glycoside hydrolases, based on sequence similarity, has led to the definition of >100 different families. This classification is available on the CAZy web site, and also discussed at CAZypedia, an online encyclopedia of carbohydrate active enzymes.

Glycoside hydrolase family 6 CAZY GH_6 comprises enzymes with several known activities including endoglucanase (EC 3.2.1.4) and cellobiohydrolase (EC 3.2.1.91). These enzymes were formerly known as cellulase family B. The 3D structure of the enzymatic core of cellobiohydrolase II (CBHII) from the fungus Trichoderma reesei reveals an alpha-beta protein with a fold similar to the ubiquitous barrel topology first seen in triose phosphate isomerase. The active site of CBHII is located at the C-terminal end of a parallel beta barrel, in an enclosed tunnel through which the cellulose threads. Two aspartic acid residues, located in the centre of the tunnel are the probable catalytic residues.
