= Glycoside hydrolase family 53 =

Glycosyl hydrolase family 53
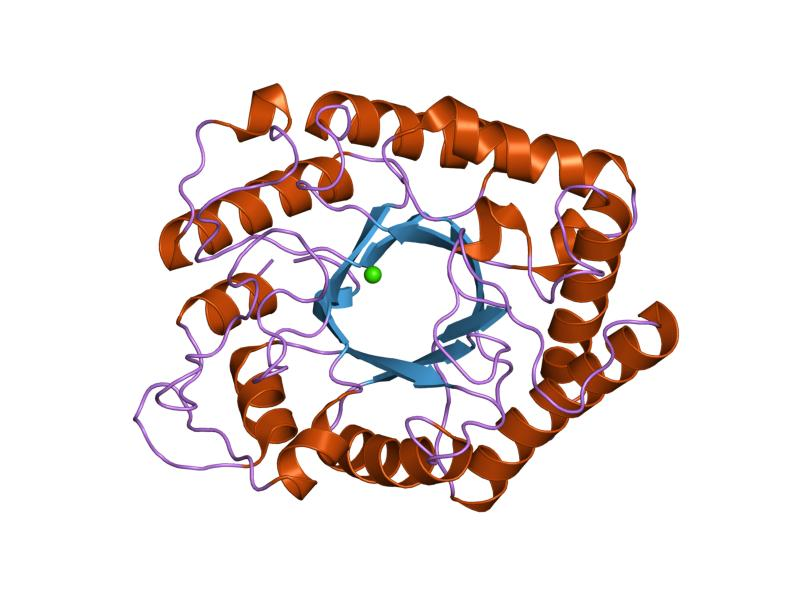
- crystal structure of beta-1,4-galactanase from aspergillus aculeatus at 100k

Identifiers
- Symbol: Glyco_hydro_53
- Pfam: PF07745
- Pfam clan: CL0058
- InterPro: IPR011683
- SCOP2: 1fob / SCOPe / SUPFAM
- OPM superfamily: 117
- OPM protein: 1hjq
- CAZy: GH53
Available protein structures:
- PDB: IPR011683 PF07745 (ECOD; PDBsum)
- AlphaFold: IPR011683; PF07745

In molecular biology, the glycoside hydrolase family 53 is a family of glycoside hydrolases EC 3.2.1., which are a widespread group of enzymes that hydrolyse the glycosidic bond between two or more carbohydrates, or between a carbohydrate and a non-carbohydrate moiety. A classification system for glycoside hydrolases, based on sequence similarity, has led to the definition of >100 different families. This classification is available on the CAZy web site, and also discussed at CAZypedia, an online encyclopedia of carbohydrate active enzymes.

These enzymes are endo-1,4- beta-galactanases EC 3.2.1.89. The structure of this domain is known and has a TIM barrel fold.
