= Glycoside hydrolase family 4 =

Family 4 glycosyl hydrolase
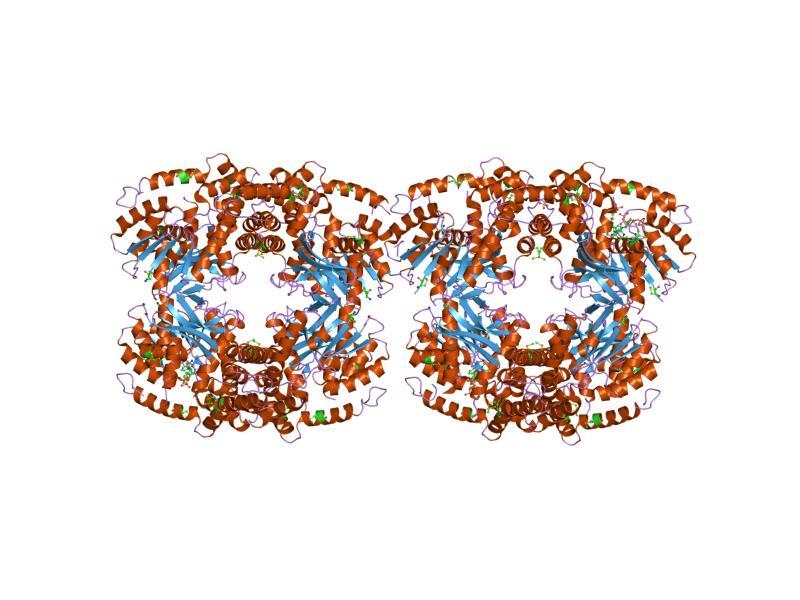
- Structure of the 6-phospho-beta glucosidase from Thermotoga maritima at 2.55 angstrom resolution in the tetragonal form with manganese, NAD+ and glucose-6-phosphate

Identifiers
- Symbol: Glyco_hydro_4
- Pfam: PF02056
- Pfam clan: CL0063
- InterPro: IPR001088
- PROSITE: PDOC01027
- SCOP2: 1obb / SCOPe / SUPFAM
- CAZy: GH4
Available protein structures:
- PDB: IPR001088 PF02056 (ECOD; PDBsum)
- AlphaFold: IPR001088; PF02056

Family 4 glycosyl hydrolase C-terminal domain

Identifiers
- Symbol: Glyco_hydro_4C
- Pfam: PF11975
- Pfam clan: CL0341
- PROSITE: PDOC01027
- SCOP2: 1obb / SCOPe / SUPFAM
- CAZy: GH4
Available protein structures:
- PDB: PF11975 (ECOD; PDBsum)
- AlphaFold: PF11975

In molecular biology, glycoside hydrolase family 4 is a family of glycoside hydrolases EC 3.2.1., which are a widespread group of enzymes that hydrolyse the glycosidic bond between two or more carbohydrates, or between a carbohydrate and a non-carbohydrate moiety. A classification system for glycoside hydrolases, based on sequence similarity, has led to the definition of >100 different families. This classification is available on the CAZy web site, and also discussed at CAZypedia, an online encyclopedia of carbohydrate active enzymes.

Glycoside hydrolase family 4 CAZY GH_4 comprises enzymes with several known activities; 6-phospho-beta-glucosidase (EC 3.2.1.86); 6-phospho-alpha-glucosidase (EC 3.2.1.122); alpha-galactosidase (EC 3.2.1.22); alpha-D-glucuronidase (EC 3.2.1.139). 6-phospho-alpha-glucosidase requires both NAD(H) and divalent metal (Mn^{2+}, Fe^{2+}, Co^{2+}, or Ni^{2+}) for activity.

== External references ==
GH4 in CAZypedia
