= Glycoside hydrolase family 57 =

Glycosyl hydrolase family 57

Identifiers
- Symbol: Glyco_hydro_57
- Pfam: PF03065
- Pfam clan: CL0158
- SCOP2: 1k1x / SCOPe / SUPFAM
- CAZy: GH57
Available protein structures:
- PDB: PF03065 (ECOD; PDBsum)
- AlphaFold: PF03065

In molecular biology, glycoside hydrolase family 57 is a family of glycoside hydrolases.

Glycoside hydrolases EC 3.2.1. are a widespread group of enzymes that hydrolyse the glycosidic bond between two or more carbohydrates, or between a carbohydrate and a non-carbohydrate moiety. A classification system for glycoside hydrolases, based on sequence similarity, has led to the definition of >100 different families. This classification is available on the CAZy web site, and also discussed at CAZypedia, an online encyclopedia of carbohydrate active enzymes.

Glycoside hydrolase family 57 CAZY GH_57 comprises enzymes with several known activities; alpha-amylase (EC 3.2.1.1), 4-alpha-glucanotransferase (EC 2.4.1.25), α-galactosidase (EC 3.2.1.22); amylopullulanase (EC 3.2.1.41); branching enzyme (EC 2.4.1.18). It includes a thermostable alpha-amylase with a broad substrate specificity from the archaebacterium Pyrococcus furiosus.
