= Glycoside hydrolase family 76 =

Glycosyl hydrolase family 76

Identifiers
- Symbol: Glyco_hydro_76
- Pfam: PF03663
- Pfam clan: CL0059
- InterPro: IPR005198
- CAZy: GH76
Available protein structures:
- PDB: IPR005198 PF03663 (ECOD; PDBsum)
- AlphaFold: IPR005198; PF03663

In molecular biology, glycoside hydrolase family 76 is a family of glycoside hydrolases.

Glycoside hydrolases EC 3.2.1. are a widespread group of enzymes that hydrolyse the glycosidic bond between two or more carbohydrates, or between a carbohydrate and a non-carbohydrate moiety. A classification system for glycoside hydrolases, based on sequence similarity, has led to the definition of >100 different families. This classification is available on the CAZy web site, and also discussed at CAZypedia, an online encyclopedia of carbohydrate active enzymes.

Glycoside hydrolase family 76 is a family of alpha-1,6-mannanases (EC 3.2.1.101) (CAZY GH_76).
