= Glycoside hydrolase family 79 =

Glycosyl hydrolase family 79, N-terminal domain

Identifiers
- Symbol: Glyco_hydro_79n
- Pfam: PF03662
- Pfam clan: CL0058
- InterPro: IPR005199
- CAZy: GH79
Available protein structures:
- PDB: IPR005199 PF03662 (ECOD; PDBsum)
- AlphaFold: IPR005199; PF03662

In molecular biology, glycoside hydrolase family 79 is a family of glycoside hydrolases.

Glycoside hydrolases EC 3.2.1. are a widespread group of enzymes that hydrolyse the glycosidic bond between two or more carbohydrates, or between a carbohydrate and a non-carbohydrate moiety. A classification system for glycoside hydrolases, based on sequence similarity, has led to the definition of >100 different families. This classification is available on the CAZy web site, and also discussed at CAZypedia, an online encyclopedia of carbohydrate active enzymes.

Glycoside hydrolase family 79 includes endo-beta-N-glucuronidase EC 3.2.1.31 and heparanase (CAZY GH_79). Heparan sulphate proteoglycans (HSPGs) play a key role in the self- assembly, insolubility and barrier properties of basement membranes and extracellular matrices. Hence, cleavage of heparan sulphate (HS) affects the integrity and functional state of tissues and thereby fundamental normal and pathological phenomena involving cell migration and response to changes in the extracellular microenvironment. Heparanase degrades HS at specific intrachain sites. The enzyme is synthesized as a latent approximately 65 kDa protein that is processed at the N-terminus into a highly active approximately 50 kDa form. Experimental evidence suggests that heparanase may facilitate both tumour cell invasion and neovascularisation, both critical steps in cancer progression. The enzyme is also involved in cell migration associated with inflammation and autoimmunity.
