= Glycoside hydrolase family 42 =

Beta-galactosidase
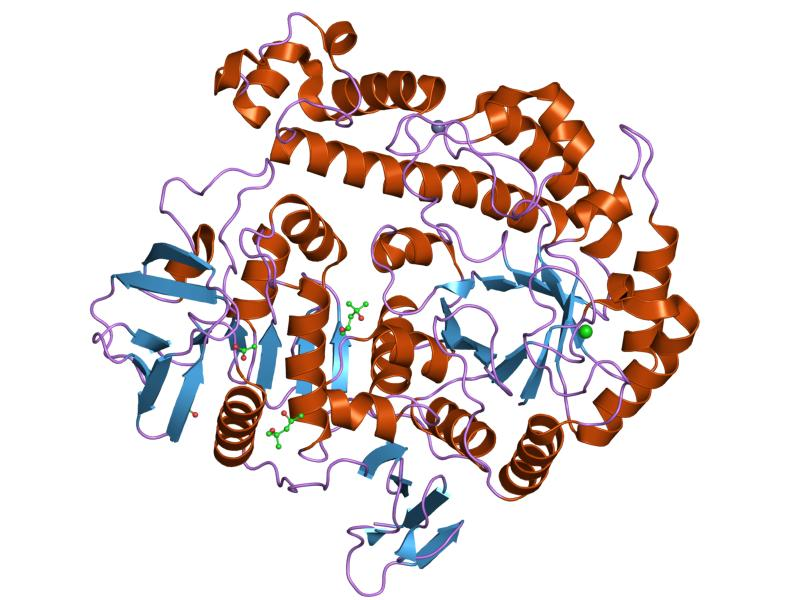
- crystal structure of thermus thermophilus a4 beta-galactosidase

Identifiers
- Symbol: Glyco_hydro_42
- Pfam: PF02449
- Pfam clan: CL0058
- InterPro: IPR013529
- SCOP2: 1kwg / SCOPe / SUPFAM
- CAZy: GH42
Available protein structures:
- PDB: IPR013529 PF02449 (ECOD; PDBsum)
- AlphaFold: IPR013529; PF02449

Beta-galactosidase trimerisation domain
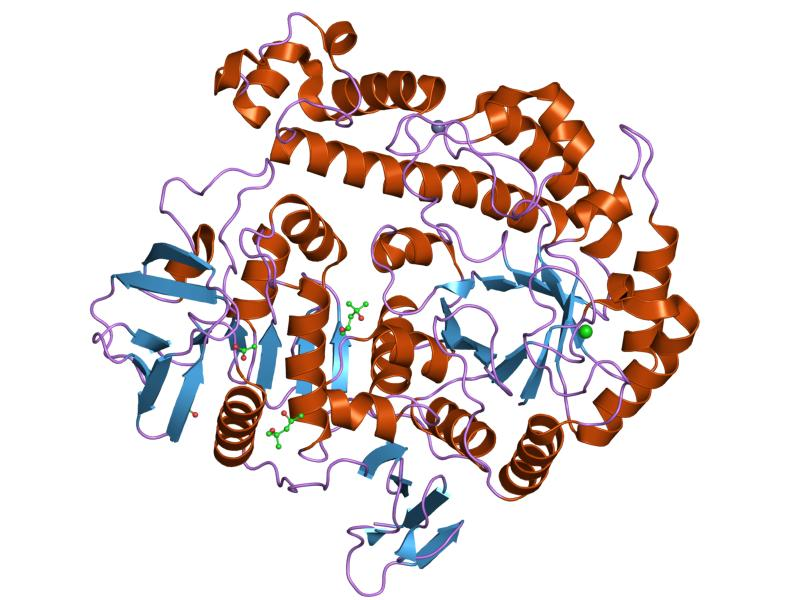
- crystal structure of thermus thermophilus a4 beta-galactosidase

Identifiers
- Symbol: Glyco_hydro_42M
- Pfam: PF08532
- Pfam clan: CL0014
- InterPro: IPR013738
- SCOP2: 1kwg / SCOPe / SUPFAM
Available protein structures:
- PDB: IPR013738 PF08532 (ECOD; PDBsum)
- AlphaFold: IPR013738; PF08532

Beta-galactosidase C-terminal domain
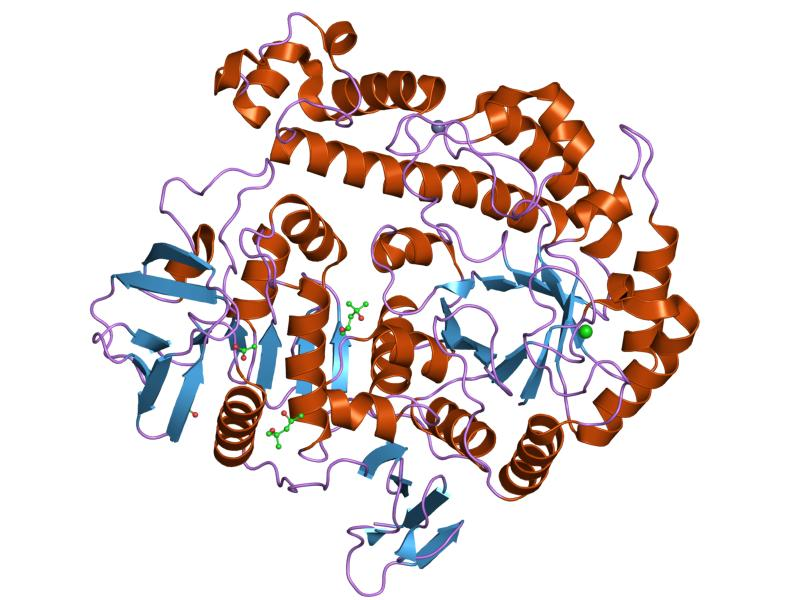
- crystal structure of thermus thermophilus a4 beta-galactosidase

Identifiers
- Symbol: Glyco_hydro_42C
- Pfam: PF08533
- Pfam clan: CL0369
- InterPro: IPR013739
- SCOP2: 1kwg / SCOPe / SUPFAM
Available protein structures:
- PDB: IPR013739 PF08533 (ECOD; PDBsum)
- AlphaFold: IPR013739; PF08533

In molecular biology, glycoside hydrolase family 42 is a family of glycoside hydrolases.

Glycoside hydrolases EC 3.2.1. are a widespread group of enzymes that hydrolyse the glycosidic bond between two or more carbohydrates, or between a carbohydrate and a non-carbohydrate moiety. A classification system for glycoside hydrolases, based on sequence similarity, has led to the definition of >100 different families. This classification is available on the CAZy web site, and also discussed at CAZypedia, an online encyclopedia of carbohydrate active enzymes.

The glycosyl hydrolase 42 family CAZY GH_42 comprises beta-galactosidase enzymes (EC 3.2.1.23). These enzyme catalyse the hydrolysis of terminal, non-reducing terminal beta-D-galactoside residues. The middle domain of these three-domain enzymes is involved in trimerisation.
