= Glycoside hydrolase family 32 =

Family of glycoside hydrolases

Glycosyl hydrolases family 32 N-terminal domain
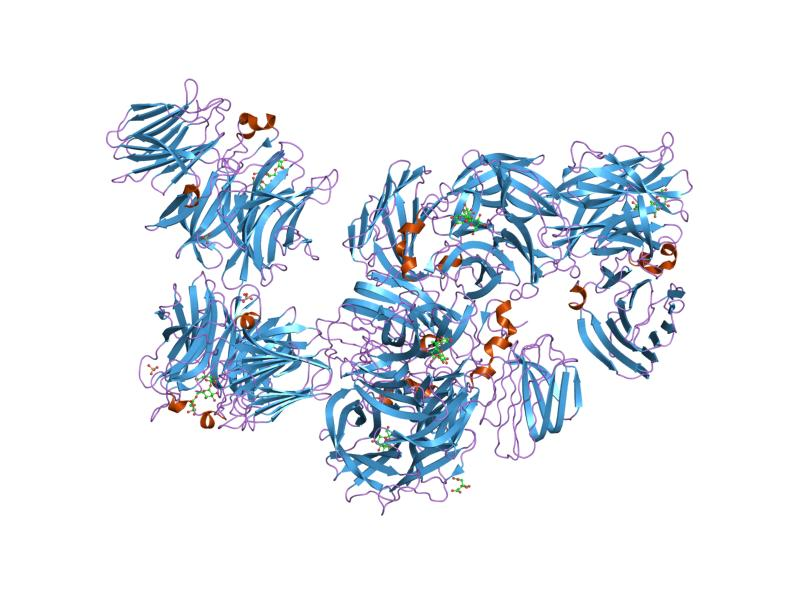
- beta-fructosidase from thermotoga maritima in complex with raffinose

Identifiers
- Symbol: Glyco_hydro_32N
- Pfam: PF00251
- Pfam clan: CL0143
- InterPro: IPR013148
- PROSITE: PDOC00532
- CAZy: GH32
Available protein structures:
- PDB: IPR013148 PF00251 (ECOD; PDBsum)
- AlphaFold: IPR013148; PF00251

Glycosyl hydrolases family 32 C terminal
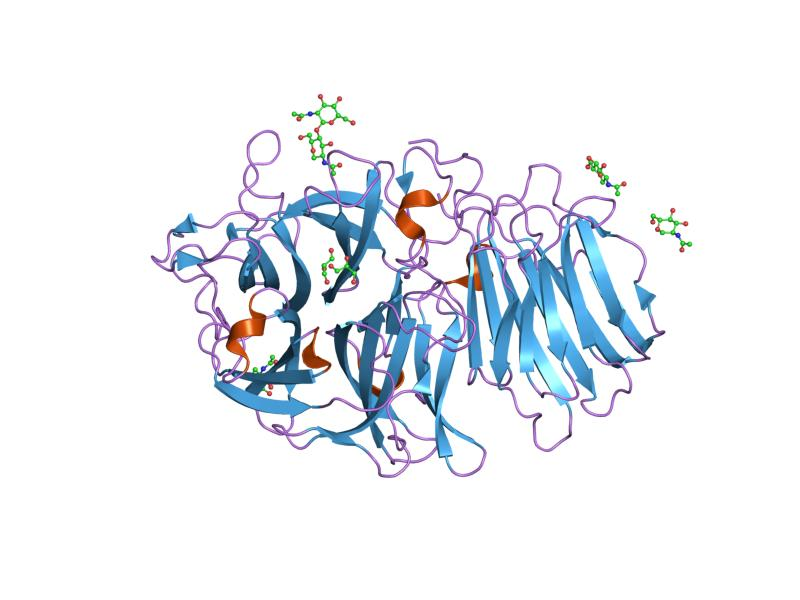
- crystal structure of exo-inulinase from aspergillus awamori in spacegroup p21

Identifiers
- Symbol: Glyco_hydro_32C
- Pfam: PF08244
- InterPro: IPR013189
- PROSITE: PDOC00532
- CAZy: GH32
Available protein structures:
- PDB: IPR013189 PF08244 (ECOD; PDBsum)
- AlphaFold: IPR013189; PF08244

In molecular biology, glycoside hydrolase family 32 is a family of glycoside hydrolases EC 3.2.1., which are a widespread group of enzymes that hydrolyse the glycosidic bond between two or more carbohydrates, or between a carbohydrate and a non-carbohydrate moiety. A classification system for glycoside hydrolases, based on sequence similarity, has led to the definition of >100 different families. This classification is available on the CAZy web site, and also discussed at CAZypedia, an online encyclopedia of carbohydrate active enzymes.

Family 32 glycosyl hydrolases comprise two distinct domains. The N-terminal domain, which forms a five bladed beta propeller, and the C-terminal domain, which forms a beta sandwich structure.
