= Glycoside hydrolase family 11 =

Glycosyl hydrolases family 11
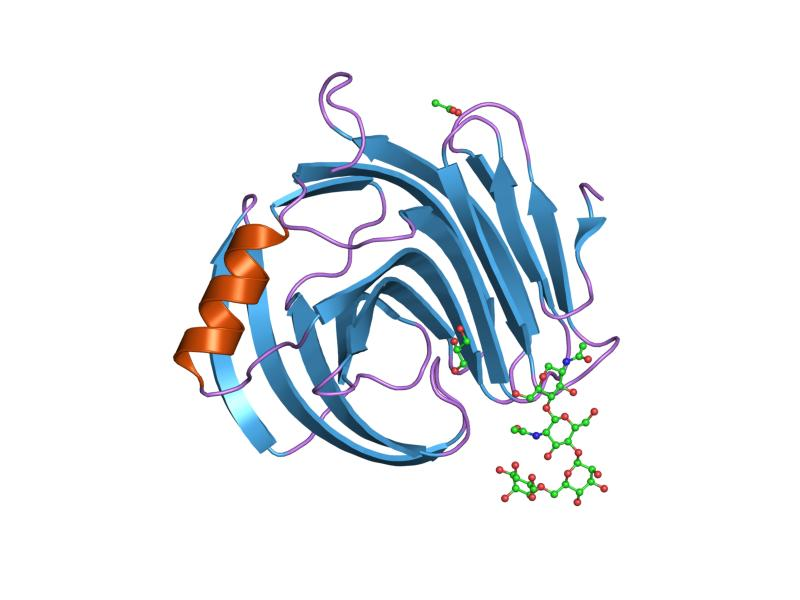
- thermophilic b-1,4-xylanase from nonomuraea flexuosa

Identifiers
- Symbol: Glyco_hydro_11
- Pfam: PF00457
- Pfam clan: CL0004
- InterPro: IPR001137
- PROSITE: PDOC00622
- SCOP2: 1xnd / SCOPe / SUPFAM
- CAZy: GH11
Available protein structures:
- PDB: IPR001137 PF00457 (ECOD; PDBsum)
- AlphaFold: IPR001137; PF00457

In molecular biology, Glycoside hydrolase family 11 is a family of glycoside hydrolases.

Glycoside hydrolases EC 3.2.1. are a widespread group of enzymes that hydrolyse the glycosidic bond between two or more carbohydrates, or between a carbohydrate and a non-carbohydrate moiety. A classification system for glycoside hydrolases, based on sequence similarity, has led to the definition of >100 different families. This classification is available on the CAZy web site, and also discussed at CAZypedia, an online encyclopedia of carbohydrate active enzymes.

Glycoside hydrolase family 11 CAZY GH_11 comprises enzymes with only one known activity, xylanase (EC 3.2.1.8). These enzymes were formerly known as cellulase family G.
