= Glycoside hydrolase family 17 =

Glycoside hydrolase, family 17
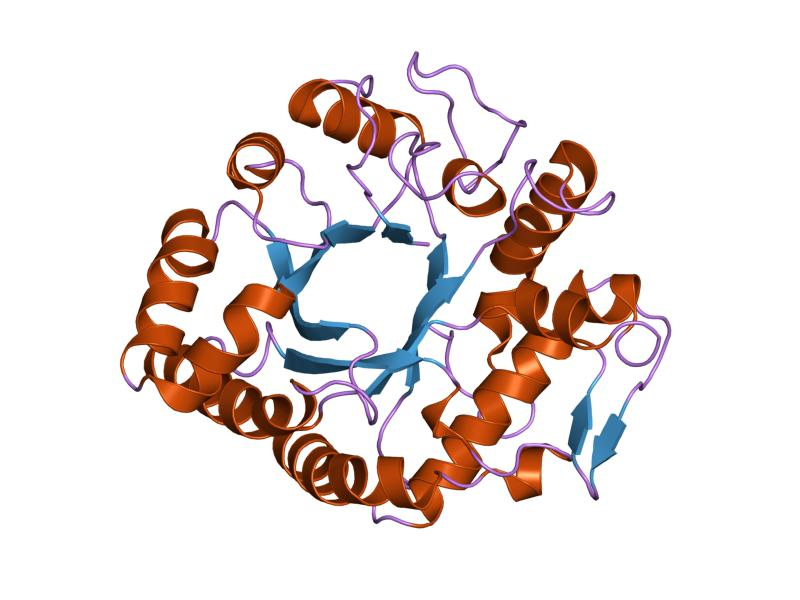
- crystal structure at 1.45- resolution of the major allergen endo-beta-1,3-glucanase of banana as a molecular basis for the latex-fruit syndrome

Identifiers
- Symbol: Glyco_hydro_17
- Pfam: PF00332
- Pfam clan: CL0058
- InterPro: IPR000490
- PROSITE: PDOC00507
- SCOP2: 1ghs / SCOPe / SUPFAM
- CAZy: GH17
Available protein structures:
- PDB: IPR000490 PF00332 (ECOD; PDBsum)
- AlphaFold: IPR000490; PF00332

In molecular biology, Glycoside hydrolase family 17 is a family of glycoside hydrolases. It folds into a TIM barrel.

Glycoside hydrolases EC 3.2.1. are a widespread group of enzymes that hydrolyse the glycosidic bond between two or more carbohydrates, or between a carbohydrate and a non-carbohydrate moiety. A classification system for glycoside hydrolases, based on sequence similarity, has led to the definition of >100 different families. This classification is available on the CAZy web site, and also discussed at CAZypedia, an online encyclopedia of carbohydrate active enzymes. y[ _]9 Glycoside hydrolase family 17 CAZY GH_17 comprises enzymes with several known activities; endo-1,3-beta-glucosidase (EC 3.2.1.39); lichenase (EC 3.2.1.73); exo-1,3-glucanase (EC 3.2.1.58). Currently these enzymes have only been found in plants and in fungi.
