= Auxiliary Activity family 9 =

Auxiliary Activity Family 9

Identifiers
- Symbol: Aux_Act_9
- Pfam: PF03443
- InterPro: IPR005103
- CAZy: AA9
Available protein structures:
- Pfam: structures / ECOD
- PDB: RCSB PDB; PDBe; PDBj
- PDBsum: structure summary

Auxiliary Activity family 9 (formerly GH61) is a family of lytic polysaccharide monooxygenases. The family was previously incorrectly classified as glycoside hydrolase family 61, however it was re-classified in March 2013.

AA9 is known to be a copper dependent, oxidative enzyme able to cleave crystalline cellulose. Activity greatly depends on the presence of a divalent copper ion and a reductant such as gallate or ascorbate. The oxidative action of AA9 can work on either the reducing or the non-reducing end of glucose moieties. Although AA9 enzymes can be found in a large spectrum of biomass degrading fungi, research into this family is relatively new. This classification is available on the CAZy web site, and also discussed at CAZypedia, an online encyclopedia of carbohydrate active enzymes.
