= Membranome database =

Online biodatabase of proteins

Membranome
Content
- Description: Data about single-span (bitopic) transmembrane proteins in genomes
- Data types captured: All bitopic proteins from six model organisms
- Organisms: Homo sapiens, Arabidopsis thaliana, Dictyostelium discoideum, Saccharomyces cerevisiae, Escherichia coli, Methanococcus jannaschii

Contact
- Research center: University of Michigan College of Pharmacy
- Primary citation: PMID 27510400
- Release date: 2017

Access
- Website: http://membranome.org
- Download URL: Archived 16 July 2018 at the Wayback Machine

Tools
- Web: FMAP and TMDOCK

Miscellaneous
- Version: 3.0
- Curation policy: Curated

Membranome database provides structural and functional information about more than 6000 single-pass (bitopic) transmembrane proteins from Homo sapiens, Arabidopsis thaliana, Dictyostelium discoideum, Saccharomyces cerevisiae, Escherichia coli and Methanocaldococcus jannaschii. Bitopic membrane proteins consist of a single transmembrane alpha-helix connecting water-soluble domains of the protein situated at the opposite sides of a biological membrane. These proteins are frequently involved in the signal transduction and communication between cells in multicellular organisms.

The database provides information about the individual proteins including computationally generated three-dimensional models of their transmembrane alpha-helices spatially arranged in the membrane, topology, intracellular localizations, amino acid sequences, domain architecture, functional annotation and available experimental structures from the Protein Data Bank. It also provides a classification of bitopic proteins into 15 functional classes, more than 700 structural superfamilies and 1400 families, along with 3D structures of bitopic protein complexes which are also classified to different families. The second Membranome version provides 3D models of more than 2000 parallel homodimers formed by TM α-helices of bitopic proteins from different organisms which were generated using TMDOCK program. The models of the homodimers were verified through comparison with available experimental data for nearly 600 proteins. The database includes downloadable coordinate files of transmembrane helices and their homodimers with calculated membrane boundaries. Membranome 3.0 version incorporates models generated by AlphaFold 2.

The database website provides access to related webservers, FMAP and TMDOCK which have been developed for modeling individual alpha-helices and their dimeric complexes in membranes. The database and webservers were used in experimental and bioinformatics studies of bitopic membrane proteins
