= CAZy =

Enzyme database

Content
- Description: carbohydrate-active enzymes database

Contact
- Research center: AFMB, French National Centre for Scientific Research
- Laboratory: Glycogenomics group
- Primary citation: Lombard & al. (2014)

Access
- Website: http://www.cazy.org/

Tools
- Web: http://research.ahv.dk/cazy http://mothra.ornl.gov/cgi-bin/cat/cat.cgi http://csbl.bmb.uga.edu/dbCAN/

CAZy is a database of Carbohydrate-Active enZYmes (CAZymes). The database contains a classification and associated information about enzymes involved in the synthesis, metabolism, and recognition of complex carbohydrates, i.e. disaccharides, oligosaccharides, polysaccharides, and glycoconjugates. Included in the database are families of glycoside hydrolases, glycosyltransferases, polysaccharide lyases, carbohydrate esterases, and non-catalytic carbohydrate-binding modules. The CAZy database also includes a classification of Auxiliary Activity redox enzymes involved in the breakdown of lignocellulose.

CAZy was established in 1999 in order to provide online and constantly updated access to the protein sequence-based family classification of CAZymes, which was originally developed in early 1990s to classify the glycoside hydrolases. New entries are added shortly after they appear in the daily releases of GenBank. The rapid evolution of high-throughput DNA sequencing has resulted in the continuing exponential growth of the CAZy database, which now covers hundreds of thousands of sequences. CAZy continues to be curated and developed by the Glycogenomics group at AFMB, a research centre affiliated with the French National Centre for Scientific Research and Aix-Marseille University.

The CAZy database is coupled with CAZypedia, which was launched in 2007 as a research community-driven, wiki-based encyclopedia of CAZymes.

== Classification ==
CAZy identifies evolutionarily related families of glycosyl hydrolases using the classification introduced by Bernard Henrissat. These families are given a number to identify them, so for example Glycosyl hydrolase family 1 contains enzymes that possess a TIM barrel fold. These families are clustered into 14 different clans that share structural similarity. CAZy contains 94 families of Glycosyl transferase enzymes, 22 families of polysaccharide lysases and 16 families of carbohydrate esterases.
