= Glycoside hydrolase =

Class of enzymes which break glycosidic bonds via hydrolysis

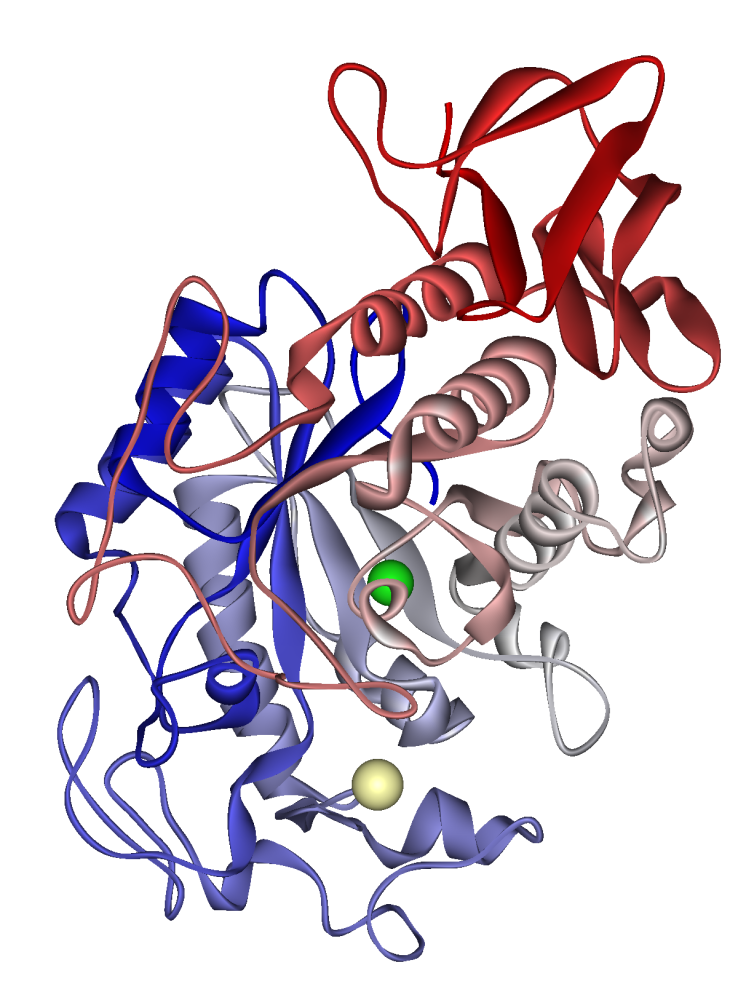
A Pancreatic alpha-Amylase 1HNY, a glycoside hydrolase

In biochemistry, glycoside hydrolases (also called glycosidases or glycosyl hydrolases) are a class of enzymes which catalyze the hydrolysis of glycosidic bonds in complex sugars. They are extremely common enzymes, with roles in nature including degradation of biomass such as cellulose (cellulase), hemicellulose, and starch (amylase), in anti-bacterial defense strategies (e.g., lysozyme), in pathogenesis mechanisms (e.g., viral neuraminidases) and in normal cellular function (e.g., trimming mannosidases involved in N-linked glycoprotein biosynthesis). Together with glycosyltransferases, glycosidases form the major catalytic machinery for the synthesis and breakage of glycosidic bonds.

== Occurrence and importance ==
Glycoside hydrolases are found in essentially all domains of life. In prokaryotes, they are found both as intracellular and extracellular enzymes that are largely involved in nutrient acquisition. One of the important occurrences of glycoside hydrolases in bacteria is the enzyme beta-galactosidase (LacZ), which is involved in regulation of expression of the lac operon in E. coli. In higher organisms glycoside hydrolases are found within the endoplasmic reticulum and Golgi apparatus where they are involved in processing of N-linked glycoproteins, and in the lysosome as enzymes involved in the degradation of carbohydrate structures. Deficiency in specific lysosomal glycoside hydrolases can lead to a range of lysosomal storage disorders that result in developmental problems or death. Glycoside hydrolases are found in the intestinal tract and in saliva where they degrade complex carbohydrates such as lactose, starch, sucrose and trehalose. In the gut they are found as glycosylphosphatidyl anchored enzymes on endothelial cells. The enzyme lactase is required for degradation of the milk sugar lactose and is present at high levels in infants, but in most populations will decrease after weaning or during infancy, potentially leading to lactose intolerance in adulthood. The enzyme O-GlcNAcase is involved in removal of N-acetylglucosamine groups from serine and threonine residues in the cytoplasm and nucleus of the cell. The glycoside hydrolases are involved in the biosynthesis and degradation of glycogen in the body.

== Classification ==
Glycoside hydrolases are classified into EC 3.2.1 as enzymes catalyzing the hydrolysis of O- or S-glycosides. Glycoside hydrolases can also be classified according to the stereochemical outcome of the hydrolysis reaction: thus they can be classified as either retaining or inverting enzymes. Glycoside hydrolases can also be classified as exo or endo acting, dependent upon whether they act at the (usually non-reducing) end or in the middle, respectively, of an oligo/polysaccharide chain. Glycoside hydrolases may also be classified by sequence or structure-based methods.

=== Sequence-based classification ===
Sequence-based classifications are one of the most powerful predictive methods for suggesting function for newly sequenced enzymes for which function has not been biochemically demonstrated. A classification system for glycosyl hydrolases, based on sequence similarity, has led to the definition of more than 100 different families. This classification is available on the CAZy (CArbohydrate-Active EnZymes) web site. The database provides a series of regularly updated sequence based classification that allow reliable prediction of mechanism (retaining/inverting), active site residues and possible substrates. The online database is supported by CAZypedia, an online encyclopedia of carbohydrate active enzymes. Based on three-dimensional structural similarities, the sequence-based families have been classified into 'clans' of related structure. Recent progress in glycosidase sequence analysis and 3D structure comparison has allowed the proposal of an extended hierarchical classification of the glycoside hydrolases.

== Mechanisms ==
=== Inverting glycoside hydrolases ===
Inverting enzymes utilize two enzymic residues, typically carboxylate residues, that act as acid and base respectively, as shown below for a β-glucosidase. The product of the reaction has an axial position on C1, but some spontaneous changes of conformation can appear.

=== Retaining glycoside hydrolases ===
Retaining glycosidases operate through a two-step mechanism, with each step resulting in inversion, for a net retention of stereochemistry. Again, two residues are involved, which are usually enzyme-borne carboxylates. One acts as a nucleophile and the other as an acid/base. In the first step, the nucleophile attacks the anomeric centre, resulting in the formation of a glycosyl enzyme intermediate, with acidic assistance provided by the acidic carboxylate. In the second step, the now deprotonated acidic carboxylate acts as a base and assists a nucleophilic water to hydrolyze the glycosyl enzyme intermediate, giving the hydrolyzed product. The mechanism is illustrated below for hen egg white lysozyme.

An alternative mechanism for hydrolysis with retention of stereochemistry can occur that proceeds through a nucleophilic residue that is bound to the substrate, rather than being attached to the enzyme. Such mechanisms are common for certain N-acetylhexosaminidases, which have an acetamido group capable of neighboring group participation to form an intermediate oxazoline or oxazolinium ion. This mechanism proceeds in two steps through individual inversions to lead to a net retention of configuration.

A variant neighboring group participation mechanism has been described for endo-α-mannanases that involves 2-hydroxyl group participation to form an intermediate epoxide. Hydrolysis of the epoxide leads to a net retention of configuration.

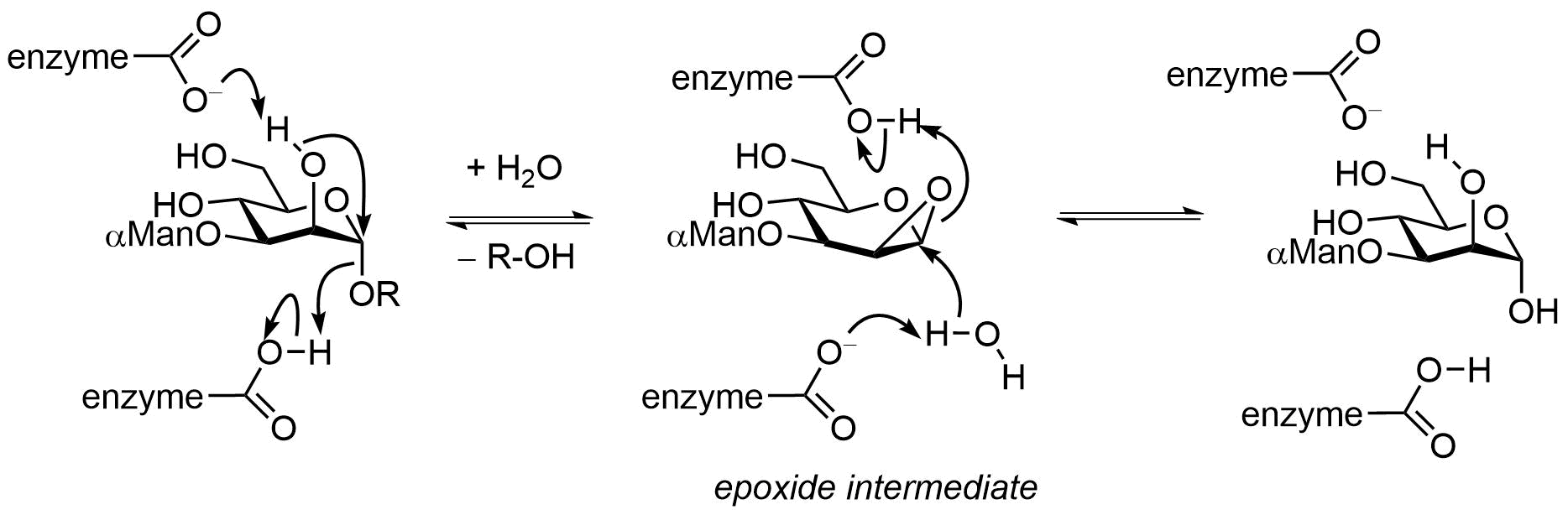

== Nomenclature and examples ==
Glycoside hydrolases are typically named after the substrate that they act upon. Thus glucosidases catalyze the hydrolysis of glucosides and xylanases catalyze the cleavage of the xylose based homopolymer xylan. Other examples include lactase, amylase, chitinase, sucrase, maltase, neuraminidase, invertase, hyaluronidase and lysozyme.

== Uses ==
Glycoside hydrolases are predicted to gain increasing roles as catalysts in biorefining applications in the future bioeconomy. These enzymes have a variety of uses including degradation of plant materials (e.g., cellulases for degrading cellulose to glucose, which can be used for ethanol production), in the food industry (invertase for manufacture of invert sugar, amylase for production of maltodextrins), and in the paper and pulp industry (xylanases for removing hemicelluloses from paper pulp). Cellulases are added to detergents for the washing of cotton fabrics and assist in the maintenance of colours through removing microfibres that are raised from the surface of threads during wear.

In organic chemistry, glycoside hydrolases can be used as synthetic catalysts to form glycosidic bonds through either reverse hydrolysis (kinetic approach) where the equilibrium position is reversed; or by transglycosylation (kinetic approach) whereby retaining glycoside hydrolases can catalyze the transfer of a glycosyl moiety from an activated glycoside to an acceptor alcohol to afford a new glycoside.

Mutant glycoside hydrolases termed glycosynthases have been developed that can achieve the synthesis of glycosides in high yield from activated glycosyl donors such as glycosyl fluorides. Glycosynthases are typically formed from retaining glycoside hydrolases by site-directed mutagenesis of the enzymic nucleophile to some other less nucleophilic group, such as alanine or glycine. Another group of mutant glycoside hydrolases termed thioglycoligases can be formed by site-directed mutagenesis of the acid-base residue of a retaining glycoside hydrolase. Thioglycoligases catalyze the condensation of activated glycosides and various thiol-containing acceptors.

Various glycoside hydrolases have shown efficacy in degrading matrix polysaccharides within the extracellular polymeric substance (EPS) of microbial biofilms. Medically, biofilms afford infectious microorganisms a variety of advantages over their planktonic, fre-floating counterparts, including greatly increased tolerances to antimicrobial agents and the host immune system. Thus, degrading the biofilm may increase antibiotic efficacy, and potentiate host immune function and healing ability. For example, a combination of alpha-amylase and cellulase was shown to degrade polymicrobial bacterial biofilms from both in vitro and in vivo sources, and increase antibiotic effectiveness against them.

== Inhibitors ==
Many compounds are known that can act to inhibit the action of a glycoside hydrolase. Nitrogen-containing, 'sugar-shaped' heterocycles have been found in nature, including deoxynojirimycin, swainsonine, australine and castanospermine. From these natural templates many other inhibitors have been developed, including isofagomine and deoxygalactonojirimycin, and various unsaturated compounds such as PUGNAc. Inhibitors that are in clinical use include the anti-diabetic drugs acarbose and miglitol, and the antiviral drugs oseltamivir and zanamivir. Some proteins have been found to act as glycoside hydrolase inhibitors.

== See also ==
- Mucopolysaccharidoses
- Glucosidase
- Lysozyme
- Glycosyltransferase
- List of glycoside hydrolase families
- Clans of glycoside hydrolases
- Hierarchical classification of the TIM-barrel type glycoside hydrolases
