= Glycoside hydrolase family 36 =

Melibiase
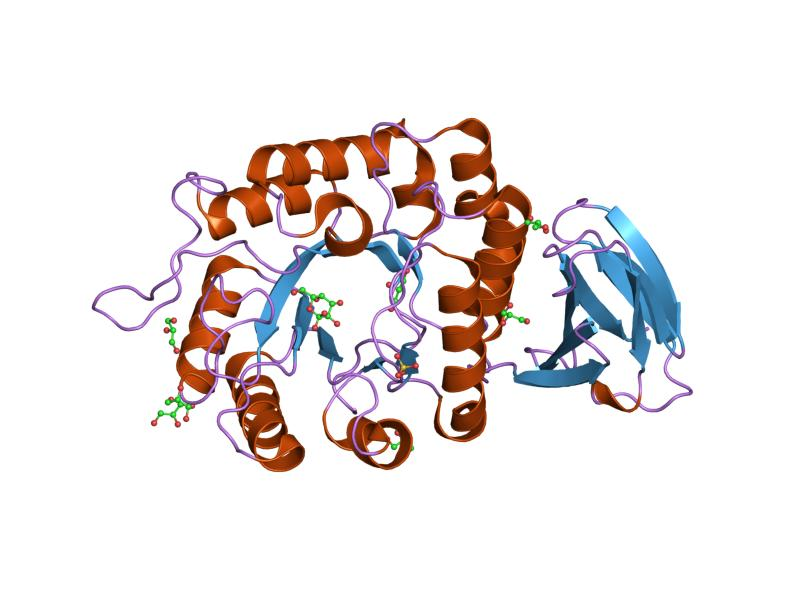
- crystal structure of rice alpha-galactosidase

Identifiers
- Symbol: Melibiase
- Pfam: PF02065
- Pfam clan: CL0058
- InterPro: IPR000111
- SCOP2: 1ktc / SCOPe / SUPFAM
- CAZy: GH36
Available protein structures:
- PDB: IPR000111 PF02065 (ECOD; PDBsum)
- AlphaFold: IPR000111; PF02065

Raffinose_syn

Identifiers
- Symbol: Raffinose_syn
- Pfam: PF05691
- Pfam clan: CL0058
- InterPro: IPR008811
- CAZy: GH36
Available protein structures:
- PDB: IPR008811 PF05691 (ECOD; PDBsum)
- AlphaFold: IPR008811; PF05691

In molecular biology, glycoside hydrolase family 36 is a family of glycoside hydrolases.

Glycoside hydrolases EC 3.2.1. are a widespread group of enzymes that hydrolyse the glycosidic bond between two or more carbohydrates, or between a carbohydrate and a non-carbohydrate moiety. A classification system for glycoside hydrolases, based on sequence similarity, has led to the definition of >100 different families. This classification is available on the CAZy web site, and also discussed at CAZypedia, an online encyclopedia of carbohydrate active enzymes.

Glycoside hydrolase family 36 together with family 31 and family 27 alpha-galactosidases form the glycosyl hydrolase clan GH-D, a superfamily of alpha-galactosidases, alpha-N-acetylgalactosaminidases, and isomaltodextranases which are likely to share a common catalytic mechanism and structural topology.

Alpha-galactosidase (EC 3.2.1.22) (melibiase) catalyzes the hydrolysis of melibiose into galactose and glucose. In man, the deficiency of this enzyme is the cause of Fabry's disease (X-linked sphingolipidosis). Alpha-galactosidase is present in a variety of organisms. There is a considerable degree of similarity in the sequence of alpha-galactosidase from various eukaryotic species. Escherichia coli alpha-galactosidase (gene melA), which requires NAD and magnesium as cofactors, is not structurally related to the eukaryotic enzymes; by contrast, an Escherichia coli plasmid encoded alpha-galactosidase (gene rafA P16551) contains a region of about 50 amino acids which is similar to a domain of the eukaryotic alpha-galactosidases. Alpha-N-acetylgalactosaminidase (EC 3.2.1.49) catalyzes the hydrolysis of terminal non-reducing N-acetyl-D-galactosamine residues in N-acetyl-alpha-D- galactosaminides. In man, the deficiency of this enzyme is the cause of Schindler and Kanzaki diseases. The sequence of this enzyme is highly related to that of the eukaryotic alpha-galactosidases.

This family also includes raffinose synthase proteins, also known as seed inhibition (Sip1) proteins. Raffinose (O-alpha- D-galactopyranosyl- (1-->6)- O-alpha- D-glucopyranosyl-(1<-->2)- O-beta- D-fructofuranoside) is a widespread oligosaccharide in plant seeds and other tissues. Raffinose synthase EC 2.4.1.82 is the enzyme that channels sucrose into the raffinose oligosaccharide pathway.

Glycoside hydrolase family 36 also includes enzymes with α-N-acetylgalactosaminidase EC 3.2.1.49 and stachyose synthase EC 2.4.1.67 activities.

Glycoside hydrolase family 36 can be subdivided into 11 families, GH36A to GH36K.
