= Disaccharidase =

Enzymes that break down disaccharides into monosaccharides

Disaccharidases are glycoside hydrolases, enzymes that break down certain types of sugars called disaccharides into simpler sugars called monosaccharides. In the human body, disaccharidases are made mostly in an area of the small intestine's wall called the brush border, making them members of the group of "brush border enzymes".

A genetic defect in one of these enzymes will cause a disaccharide intolerance, such as lactose intolerance or sucrose intolerance.

== Examples of disaccharidases ==
- Lactase (breaks down lactose into glucose and galactose)
- Maltase (breaks down maltose into 2 glucoses)
- Sucrase (breaks down sucrose into glucose and fructose)
- Trehalase (breaks down trehalose into 2 glucoses)

For a thorough scientific overview of small-intestinal disaccharidases, one can consult chapter 75 of OMMBID. For more online resources and references, see inborn error of metabolism.
