= Glucan 1,4-α-glucosidase =

Enzyme that hydrolyses terminal α-1,4-D-glucose residues of polysaccharides

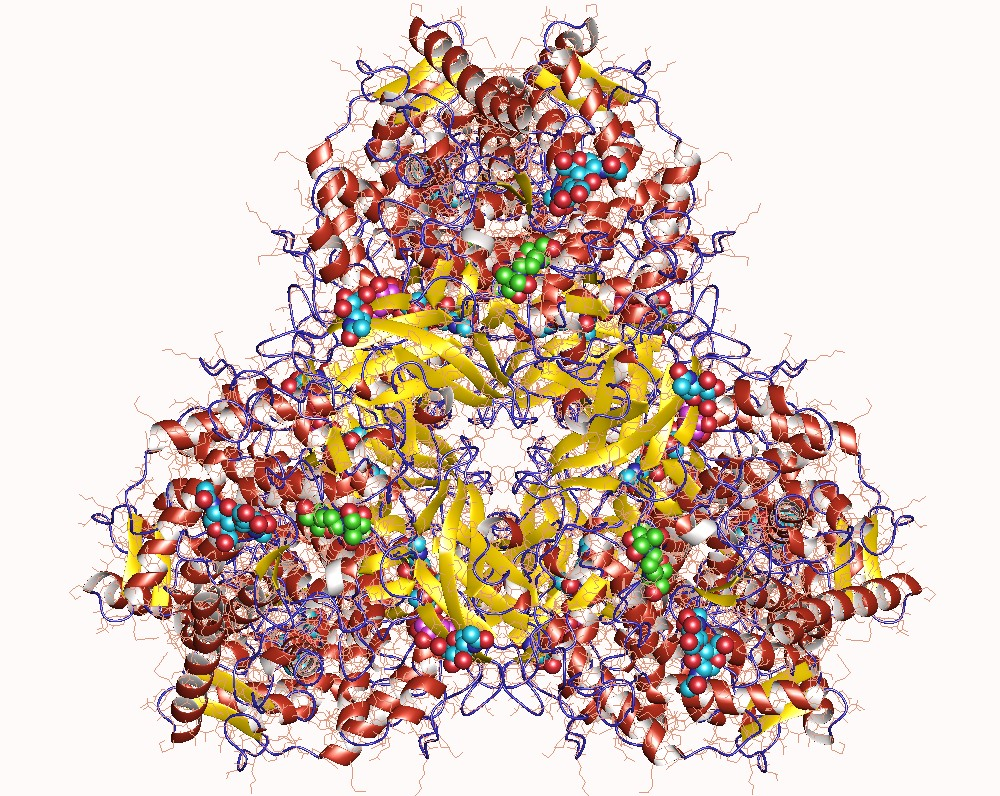
- Glucoamylase homohexamer, Penicillium oxalicum

Identifiers
- EC no.: 3.2.1.3
- CAS no.: 9032-08-0

Databases
- BRENDA: enzyme data
- ExPASy: NiceZyme view
- KEGG: enzyme entry
- MetaCyc: metabolic pathway
- Rhea: reactions
- PDB structures: RCSB PDB PDBe PDBsum
Search
- PMC: articles
- PubMed: articles
- NCBI: proteins

Glucan 1,4-α-glucosidase (EC 3.2.1.3, glucoamylase, amyloglucosidase, γ-amylase, lysosomal α-glucosidase, acid maltase, exo-1,4-α-glucosidase, glucose amylase, γ-1,4-glucan glucohydrolase, acid maltase, 1,4-α-D-glucan glucohydrolase) is an enzyme located on the brush border of the small intestine with systematic name 4-α-D-glucan glucohydrolase. It catalyses the following chemical reaction

Hydrolysis of terminal (1→4)-linked α-D-glucose residues successively from non-reducing ends of the chains with release of β-D-glucose

Most forms of the enzyme can rapidly hydrolyse 1,6-α-D-glucosidic bonds when the next bond in the sequence is 1,4. They belong to a variety of different families, such as glycoside hydrolase family 15 in fungi, glycoside hydrolase family 31 of human intestine MGAM, and glycoside hydrolase family 97 of bacterial forms. It was also known as γ-amylase.

The substrate spectrum is:

1. Starch (soluble, hydrolysis of raw starch) + H2O
2. Glycogen + H2O
3. Amylose + H2O
4. Amylopectin + H2O
5. Dextrin + H2O
6. Maltotriose (or maltotetraose, maltopentaose, maltohexaose, maltoheptaose) + H2O
7. Panose (alpha-glucopyranosyl-(1-6)-maltose) + H2O
8. Phenyl-alpha-maltoside + H2O
9. More (preference for high MW molecules with alpha-(1-4)-linkages, slow hydrolysis of alpha-(1-6)-linked oligo-or polysaccharides, no hydrolysis of alpha-(1-6)-linkages)

Inhibitors include AgNO3, KMnO4, Cd2+, Ca2+, Acarbose, Cyclic dextrins (competitive), Alpha-D-glucosides (competitive), Glucose, Tris, (2-Amino-2-ethyl-1, 3-propanediol), Maltitol, 1-Deoxynijirimycin, Trestaine, EDTA, Alpha-methyl glucoside (hydrolysis of starch and maltose), Hg2+, Mn2+, Pb2+, Cu2+, Ag2+, Co2+, D-Glucono-delta-lactone, and Al3+.

== See also ==
- Amylase
