= Fructan β-fructosidase =

Identifiers
- EC no.: 3.2.1.80
- CAS no.: 37288-56-5

Databases
- IntEnz: IntEnz view
- BRENDA: BRENDA entry
- ExPASy: NiceZyme view
- KEGG: KEGG entry
- MetaCyc: metabolic pathway
- PRIAM: profile
- PDB structures: RCSB PDB PDBe PDBsum
Search
- PMC: articles
- PubMed: articles
- NCBI: proteins

Fructan β-fructosidase (EC 3.2.1.80, exo-β-D-fructosidase, exo-β-fructosidase, polysaccharide β-fructofuranosidase, fructan exohydrolase) is an enzyme with systematic name β-D-fructan fructohydrolase. It catalyses the hydrolysis of terminal, non-reducing (2→1)- and (2→6)-linked β-D-fructofuranose residues in fructans. Fructans are also a type of fructoside.

== Industrial use and safety ==
Fructan β-fructosidase is used in the food industry to hydrolyze sucrose and also fructans such as inulin and levan into fructose, which is useful in the production of fructose syrups and other food ingredients. One such enzyme preparation is produced using a genetically modified strain of Trichoderma reesei (strain AR-577), which has been evaluated for safety by the European Food Safety Authority (EFSA).

According to EFSA's 2024 report, the genetic modifications in the production strain do not give rise to safety concerns, and the final enzyme preparation is free from viable T. reesei cells and its DNA. Toxicological studies, including a 90-day oral toxicity test in rats and genotoxicity assessments, revealed no adverse effects. Additionally, an allergenicity assessment based on amino acid sequence comparison found no significant similarity to known allergens, suggesting a low likelihood of allergic reactions under the intended conditions of use.

== Biological function and natural occurrence ==
Fructan β-fructosidase enzymes occur naturally in various plant species, where they play a key role in mobilizing carbohydrate reserves. A study on Helianthus tuberosus (Jerusalem artichoke) tubers demonstrated that the activity of fructan β-fructosidase varies seasonally, with the highest activity observed during the sprouting period when carbohydrate mobilization is most critical for growth.

The same study also characterized a β-(2-1)-linkage specific fructan β-fructosidase (FEH), which preferentially hydrolyzed inulin-type fructans rather than levan-type substrates. This specificity highlights the existence of distinct isoforms of FEH enzymes that vary by substrate preference.

== Applications in food fermentation and nutrition ==
Fructan β-fructosidase enzymes are also applied in food biotechnology, particularly for modifying dietary carbohydrate content during fermentation. A study on Lactobacillus paracasei identified a β-fructosidase known as FosE, which actively degrades fructans during sourdough fermentation. This enzymatic activity significantly reduces the levels of fermentable oligosaccharides, disaccharides, monosaccharides, and polyols (FODMAPs), which are commonly associated with gastrointestinal symptoms in individuals with irritable bowel syndrome (IBS).

By reducing FODMAP content, the use of fructan-degrading enzymes like FosE in fermentation improves the digestibility of baked products such as steamed bread. This demonstrates the enzyme's role not only in carbohydrate metabolism but also in enhancing the nutritional profile of fermented foods for sensitive populations.
