= Sucrose α-glucosidase =

Class of enzymes

Identifiers
- EC no.: 3.2.1.48
- CAS no.: 37288-39-4

Databases
- BRENDA: enzyme data
- ExPASy: NiceZyme view
- KEGG: enzyme entry
- MetaCyc: metabolic pathway
- Rhea: reactions
- PDB structures: RCSB PDB PDBe PDBsum
Search
- PMC: articles
- PubMed: articles
- NCBI: proteins

Sucrose α-glucosidase (EC 3.2.1.48, sucrose α-glucohydrolase, sucrase, sucrase-isomaltase, sucrose.α.-glucohydrolase, intestinal sucrase, sucrase(invertase)) is an enzyme with systematic name sucrose-α-D-glucohydrolase. It catalyses the hydrolysis of sucrose and maltose by an α-D-glucosidase-type action.

For example, sucrose is hydolysed to fructose and glucose (shown in their aldehydo forms):

sucrose
H_{2}O
fructose
+
glucose

This enzyme is isolated from intestinal mucosa as a single polypeptide chain. The human sucrase-isomaltase is a dual-function enzyme with two GH31 domains, one serving as the isomaltase, the other serving as a sucrose α-glucosidase.
