= Maltose-transporting ATPase =

Class of enzymes

maltose-transporting ATPase

Identifiers
- EC no.: 3.6.3.19

Databases
- IntEnz: IntEnz view
- BRENDA: BRENDA entry
- ExPASy: NiceZyme view
- KEGG: KEGG entry
- MetaCyc: metabolic pathway
- PRIAM: profile
- PDB structures: RCSB PDB PDBe PDBsum
- Gene Ontology: AmiGO / QuickGO
Search
- PMC: articles
- PubMed: articles
- NCBI: proteins

In enzymology, a maltose-transporting ATPase (EC 3.6.3.19) is an enzyme that catalyzes the chemical reaction

ATP + H_{2}O + maltoseout $\rightleftharpoons$ ADP + phosphate + maltosein

The 3 substrates of this enzyme are ATP, H_{2}O, and maltose, whereas its 3 products are ADP, phosphate, and maltose.

This enzyme belongs to the family of hydrolases, specifically those acting on acid anhydrides to catalyse transmembrane movement of substances. The systematic name of this enzyme class is ATP phosphohydrolase (maltose-importing). This enzyme is a member of the ABC Transporter family.

== Structural studies ==
As of late 2007, two structures have been solved for this class of enzymes, with PDB accession codes 2AWN and 2AWO.
