= Sacrosidase =

Pharmaceutical product

Clinical data
- Trade names: Sucraid
- AHFS/Drugs.com: Monograph
- Routes of administration: Oral
- ATC code: A16AB06 (WHO)

Legal status
- Legal status: US: ℞-only

Identifiers
- CAS Number: 85897-35-4
- ChemSpider: none
- UNII: 8A7F670F2Y
- ChEMBL: ChEMBL1201487

Sacrosidase (trade name Sucraid) is a medication used to replace sucrase in people lacking this enzyme. It is available as an oral solution. Sucraid is approved by the U.S. Food and Drug Administration (FDA) for the therapy of the genetically determined sucrase deficiency that is part of the Congenital Sucrase-Isomaltase Deficiency (CSID). Sacrosidase assists in the breakdown of sugar/sucrose into simpler forms and is useful for the relief of gastrointestinal symptoms that are associated with CSID.
