= Simiaoa sunii =

Scientific classification
- Domain: Bacteria
- Kingdom: Bacillati
- Phylum: Bacillota
- Class: Clostridia
- Order: Eubacteriales
- Family: Lachnospiraceae
- Genus: Simiaoa
- Species: S. sunii

Binomial name
- Simiaoa sunii Liu et al. 2021

Species of the bacteria

Simiaoa sunii is a rod shaped bacterium that is non-mobile and is found in the gut of humans. This species was first discovered in 2021 in a study to create a Gut Microbiome Biobank. It was discovered in fecal samples from 239 healthy Chinese volunteers. The species was named after the historical Chinese medical scientist Sun Simiao (Tang dynasty, 618–907).

== Taxonomy, morphology and physiology ==
The structure of the species is made up of 160 amino acids, has been 3D modelled and the species' DNA has been sequenced. This species was grown in MGAM medium for 2–10 days at 37 °C, pH 7.0–7.5.

== Mitochondrial base editing ==
Mitochondrial base editing tools can be used to alter the function of genes by mutating a targeted DNA sequence. Where methods to do this, such as CRISPR, are unable to be used alternative methods have been investigated. Researchers at Wang Yaming Laboratory at Pekings University College of the Future identified a DddA homolog (Ddd_Ss) from S. sunii and was used to develop a method to mutate mtDNA loci. With a further single alteration of the amino acids of Ddd_Ss, the activity and sequence compatibility of homologs from Burkholderia cenocepacia were also improved.
