= Maltase-glucoamylase =

Enzyme

MGAM
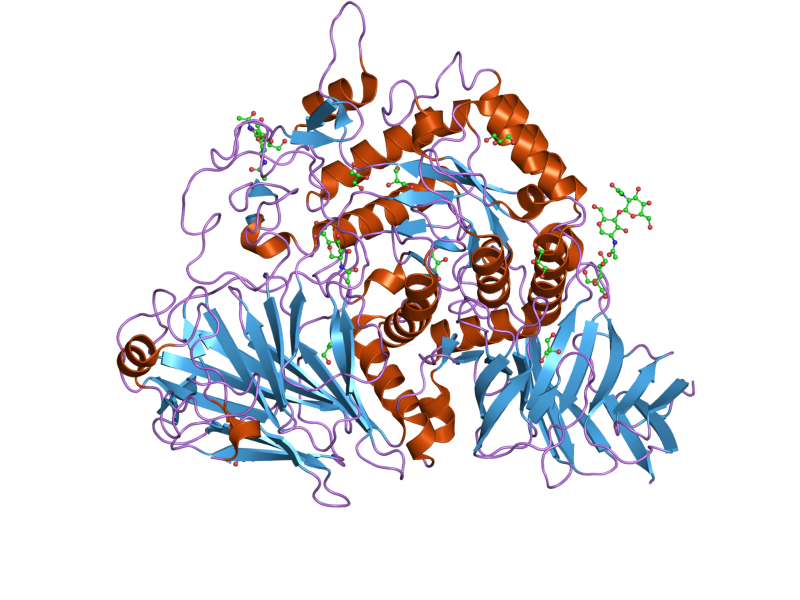

Identifiers
- Aliases: MGAM, MG, MGA, Maltase-glucoamylase
- External IDs: OMIM: 154360; MGI: 1203495; GeneCards: MGAM
Available structures
PDB	Human UniProt search: PDBe RCSB
PDB	List of PDB id codes 2QLY, 2QMJ, 3CTT, 3L4T, 3L4U, 3L4V, 3L4W, 3L4X, 3L4Y, 3L4Z, 3TON, 3TOP
Enzyme activity
EC #	BRENDA	ExPASy	KEGG	MetaCyc
3.2.1.20	↗	↗	↗	↗

Gene location (Human)
Chr.	Chromosome 7 (human)
Band	7q34	Start	141,907,813 bp
Band	7q34	End	142,106,747 bp

Gene location (Mouse)
Chr.	Chromosome 6 (mouse)
Band	6|6 B1	Start	40,605,765 bp
Band	6|6 B1	End	40,746,057 bp
RNA expression pattern
Bgee	Human / Mouse (ortholog); Top expressed in: duodenum; blood; bone marrow cell; spleen; right lung; granulocyte; human kidney; monocyte; gonad; renal cortex / Top expressed in: jejunum; duodenum; ileum; Paneth cell; epithelium of small intestine; colon; left colon; granulocyte; migratory enteric neural crest cell; human kidney; More reference expression data
BioGPS	n/a
Gene ontology
Molecular function	hydrolase activity, acting on glycosyl bonds; maltose alpha-glucosidase activity; hydrolase activity, hydrolyzing O-glycosyl compounds; catalytic activity; alpha-1,4-glucosidase activity; hydrolase activity; amylase activity; glucan 1,4-alpha-glucosidase activity; carbohydrate binding; alpha-glucosidase activity
Cellular component	integral component of membrane; plasma membrane; apical plasma membrane; extracellular exosome; membrane; tertiary granule membrane; ficolin-1-rich granule membrane
Biological process	polysaccharide digestion; metabolism; starch catabolic process; maltose metabolic process; neutrophil degranulation; carbohydrate metabolic process
Sources:Amigo / QuickGO
Orthologs
Databases	NCBI: entry; OMA: entry
Species	Human	Mouse
Entrez	8972	232714
Ensembl	ENSG00000257335; ENSG00000282607	ENSMUSG00000068587
UniProt	O43451	n/a
RefSeq (mRNA)	NM_004668; NM_001365693	NM_001171003; NM_001368875
RefSeq (protein)	NP_004659; NP_001352622	n/a
Location (UCSC)	Chr 7: 141.91 – 142.11 Mb	Chr 6: 40.61 – 40.75 Mb
PubMed search
- Wikidata
View/Edit Human	View/Edit Mouse

Maltase-glucoamylase, intestinal is an enzyme that in humans is encoded by the MGAM gene.

Maltase-glucoamylase is an alpha-glucosidase digestive enzyme. It consists of two subunits with differing substrate specificity. Recombinant enzyme studies have shown that its N-terminal catalytic domain has highest activity against maltose, while the C-terminal domain has a broader substrate specificity and activity against glucose oligomers. In the small intestine, this enzyme works in synergy with sucrase-isomaltase and alpha-amylase to digest the full range of dietary starches.

== Gene ==
The MGAM gene –– which is located on chromosome 7q34 –– codes for the protein Maltase-Glucoamylase. An alternative name for Maltase-Glucoamylase is glucan 1,4-alpha-glycosidase.

== Tissue distribution ==
Maltase-glucoamylase is a membrane-bound enzyme located in the intestinal walls. This lining of the intestine forms brush border in which food has to pass in order for the intestines to absorb the food.

== Enzymatic mechanism ==
This enzyme is a part of a family of enzymes called glycoside hydrolase family 31 (GH31). This is due to the digestive mechanism of the enzyme. GH31 enzymes undergo what is known as the Koshland double displacement mechanism in which a glycosylation and deglycosylation step occurs, resulting in the retention of the overall configuration of the anomeric center.

== Structure ==
=== N-terminal maltase ===
The N-terminal maltase-glucoamylase enzymatic unit is in turn composed of 5 specific protein domains. The first of the 5 protein domains consist of a P-type trefoil domain containing a cysteine rich domain. Second is an N-terminal beta-sandwich domain, identified via two antiparallel beta pleated sheets. The third and largest domain consists of a catalytic (beta/alpha) barrel type domain containing two inserted loops. The fourth and 5th domains are C-terminal domains, similar to the N-terminal beta-sandwich domain. The N-terminal Maltase-glucoamylase does not have the +2/+3 sugar binding active sites and so it cannot bind to larger substrates. The N-terminal domain shows its optimal enzymatic affinity for substrates maltose, maltotriose, maltotetrose, and maltopentose.

=== C-terminal glucase ===
The C-terminal glucase enzymatic unit contains extra binding sites, which allows for it to bind to larger substrates for catalytic digestion. It was originally understood that maltase-glucoamylase's crystalline structure was inherently similar throughout the N and C-termini. Further studies have found that the C-terminus is composed of 21 more amino acid residues than the N-terminus, which account for its difference in function. Sucrase-Isomaltase –– located on chromosome 3q26–– has a similar crystalline structure to maltase-glucoamylase and work in tandem in the human small intestine. They have been derived from a common ancestor, as they both come from the same GH31 family. As a result of having similar properties, both of these enzymes work together in the small intestine in order to convert consumed starch into glucose for metabolic energy. The difference between these two enzymes is that maltase-glucoamylase has a specific activity at the 1-4 linkage of sugar, where at SI has a specific activity at the 1-6 linkage.

== See also ==
- Alpha-glucosidase
- Maltase
