= NAGA (gene) =

Protein-coding gene in the species Homo sapiens

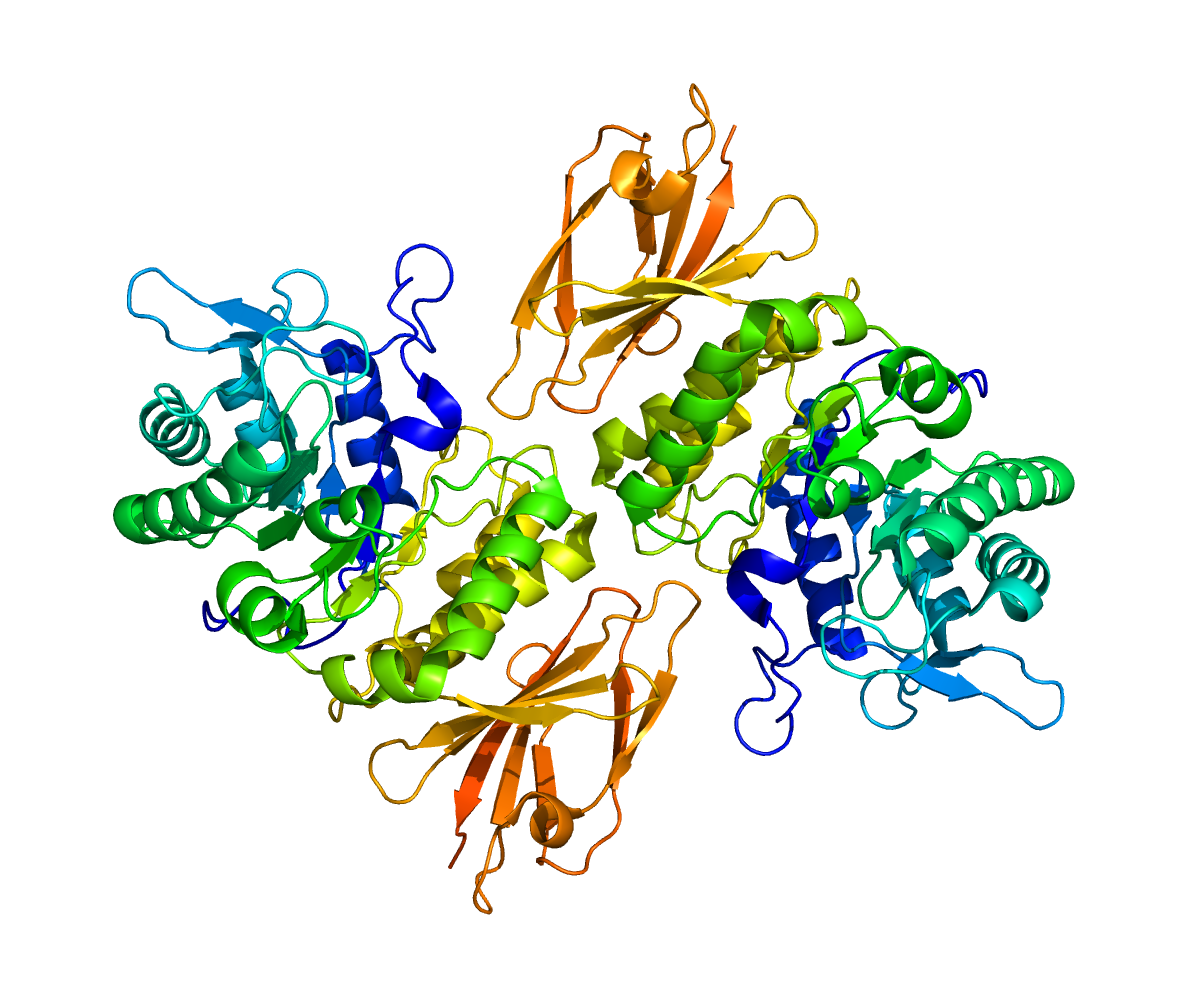

Identifiers
- Aliases: NAGA, D22S674, GALB, alpha-N-acetylgalactosaminidase
- External IDs: OMIM: 104170; MGI: 1261422; GeneCards: NAGA
Available structures
PDB	Ortholog search: PDBe RCSB
PDB	List of PDB id codes 4DO5, 3H53, 3IGU, 4DO4, 4DO6, 3H54, 3H55
Enzyme activity
EC #	BRENDA	ExPASy	KEGG	MetaCyc
3.2.1.49	↗	↗	↗	↗

Gene location (Human)
Chr.	Chromosome 22 (human)
Band	22q13.2	Start	42,058,334 bp
Band	22q13.2	End	42,070,842 bp

Gene location (Mouse)
Chr.	Chromosome 15 (mouse)
Band	15 E1|15 38.56 cM	Start	82,213,733 bp
Band	15 E1|15 38.56 cM	End	82,223,126 bp
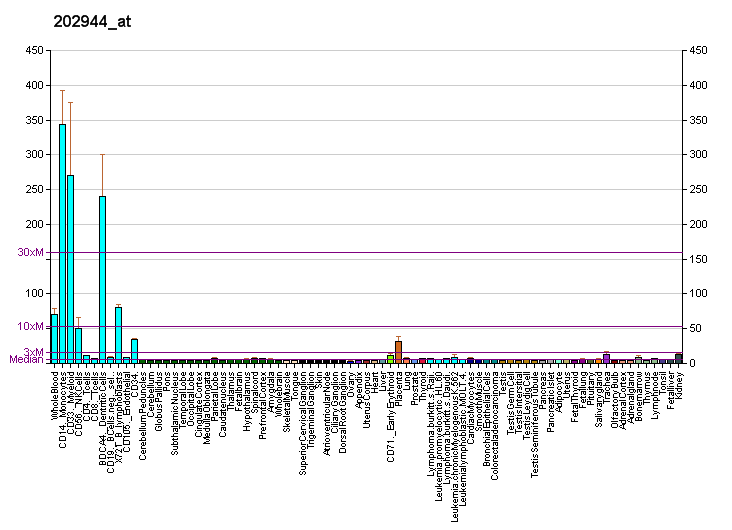

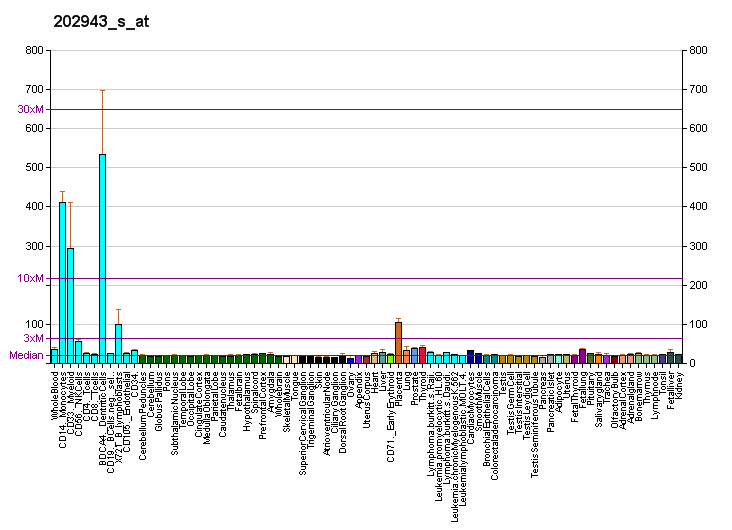
RNA expression pattern
Bgee	Human / Mouse (ortholog); Top expressed in: monocyte; granulocyte; stromal cell of endometrium; gonad; gallbladder; rectum; placenta; appendix; Descending thoracic aorta; olfactory zone of nasal mucosa / Top expressed in: islet of Langerhans; choroid plexus of fourth ventricle; yolk sac; right kidney; decidua; stomach; stroma of bone marrow; epithelium of stomach; lacrimal gland; neural layer of retina; More reference expression data
BioGPS	More reference expression data
Gene ontology
Molecular function	hydrolase activity, hydrolyzing O-glycosyl compounds; alpha-N-acetylgalactosaminidase activity; hydrolase activity; protein homodimerization activity; alpha-galactosidase activity; catalytic activity; hydrolase activity, acting on glycosyl bonds
Cellular component	cytoplasm; lysosome; extracellular exosome
Biological process	carbohydrate catabolic process; metabolism; glycoside catabolic process; glycolipid catabolic process; oligosaccharide metabolic process; glycosylceramide catabolic process; carbohydrate metabolic process
Sources:Amigo / QuickGO
Orthologs
Databases	NCBI: entry; OMA: entry
Species	Human	Mouse
Entrez	4668	17939
Ensembl	ENSG00000198951	ENSMUSG00000022453
UniProt	P17050	Q9QWR8
RefSeq (mRNA)	NM_000262; NM_001362848; NM_001362850	NM_008669; NM_001355546
RefSeq (protein)	NP_000253; NP_001349777; NP_001349779; NP_000253.1	NP_032695; NP_001342475
Location (UCSC)	Chr 22: 42.06 – 42.07 Mb	Chr 15: 82.21 – 82.22 Mb
PubMed search
- Wikidata
View/Edit Human	View/Edit Mouse

Alpha-N-acetylgalactosaminidase is an enzyme that in humans is encoded by the NAGA gene.

NAGA encodes the lysosomal enzyme alpha-N-acetylgalactosaminidase, which cleaves alpha-N-acetylgalactosaminyl moieties from glycoconjugates. Mutations in NAGA have been identified as the cause of Schindler disease types I and II (type II also known as Kanzaki disease).
