= Invertase =

Class of enzymes hydrolyzing disaccharides

Identifiers
- EC no.: 3.2.1.26
- CAS no.: 9001-57-4

Databases
- BRENDA: enzyme data
- ExPASy: NiceZyme view
- KEGG: enzyme entry
- MetaCyc: metabolic pathway
- Rhea: reactions
- PDB structures: RCSB PDB PDBe PDBsum
Search
- PMC: articles
- PubMed: articles
- NCBI: proteins

β-Fructofuranosidase is an enzyme that catalyzes the hydrolysis (breakdown) of the table sugar sucrose into fructose and glucose. Sucrose is a fructoside. Alternative names for β-fructofuranosidase EC 3.2.1.26 include invertase, saccharase, glucosucrase, β-fructosidase, invertin, fructosylinvertase, alkaline invertase, and acid invertase. The resulting mixture of fructose and glucose is called inverted sugar syrup. Related to invertases are sucrases. Invertases and sucrases hydrolyze sucrose to give the same mixture of glucose and fructose. Invertase is a glycoprotein that hydrolyses (cleaves) the non-reducing terminal β-fructofuranoside residues. Invertases cleave the O-C(fructose) bond, whereas the sucrases cleave the O-C(glucose) bond. Invertase cleaves the α-1,2-glycosidic bond of sucrose.

For industrial use, invertase is usually derived from yeast. It is also synthesized by bees, which use it to make honey from nectar. The temperature optimum is 60 °C and a pH optimum is 4.5. Sugar can be inverted by sulfuric acid but this is not suitable for food-grade products and enzymic hydrolysis is preferred.

Invertase is produced by various organisms such as yeast, fungi, bacteria, higher plants, and animals. For example: Saccharomyces cerevisiae, Saccharomyces carlsbergensis, S. pombe, Aspergillus spp, Penicillium chrysogenum, Azotobacter spp, Lactobacillus spp, Pseudomonas spp etc.

== Applications and examples ==
Invertase is used to produce inverted sugar syrup.

Invertase is expensive, so it may be preferable to make fructose from glucose using glucose isomerase, instead. Chocolate-covered candies, other cordials, and fondant candies include invertase, which liquefies the sugar.

== Inhibition ==
Urea acts as a pure non-competitive inhibitor of invertase, presumably by breaking the intramolecular hydrogen bonds contributing to the tertiary structure of the enzyme.

== Structure and function ==
=== Reaction pathway ===
Invertase works to catalyze the cleavage of sucrose into its two monosaccharides, α-D-glucose and β-D-fructose. This specific invertase (β-fructofuranosidase) cleaves the molecule from its fructose end resulting in the two monosaccharides with their stereochemical configuration maintained:

sucrose
H_{2}O
α-D-glucopyranose
+
β-D-fructofuranose

It does this by adding a hydrogen ion to the glycosidic atom from an imidazolium cation. From there, an unstable intermediate carbonium ion is left behind as the glucose group leaves. Finally, the nucleophilic oxygen atom from water attacks the C-2 cation, giving a fructose molecule. The active-site carboxylate anion acts to keep the unequal balance of electrons stabilized throughout this process.

=== Purpose of invertase in yeast ===
As mentioned previously, invertase is commonly found in bakers' yeast. One of the main reasons that bakers use this yeast is to help bread rise, but another reason is to help influence the increase of sugar in bread. This function is able to happen due to the presence of invertase since the combination of glucose and fructose is sweeter than sucrose is. When looking at invertase across different species of yeasts, it has been known to be more active in some than others. The yeast that invertase is more active in is the yeast bakers use due to its higher sweetness levels.

=== Known crystal structures ===
Continuing to look at invertase through Saccharomyces, it can be seen that it has a unique structure; that structure being an octameric quaternary structure. Within the octameric quaternary structure, two dimerization types can be seen that in turn, form the octamer structure. Dimerization is an important aspect of protein folding due to it increasing the affinity of substrate binding. The crystal structure shows that the invertase is made up of eight subunits. The octamer shape is made up of two different types of dimers, a “‘closed’ arrangement” and an “‘open’ assembly” dimer. Each of these types has two subunits located opposite from each other in the structure. The “‘closed’ arrangement” dimers have fourteen out of the 32 hydrogen bonds made between the catalytic domain which creates a tighter pocket for the ligand; in turn, this makes it more stable. In contrast, the “‘open’ assembly” dimers only have a few hydrogen bonds in the catalytic domain, and the interactions that strengthen the pocket come from the salt bridges between Asp-45 and Lys-385. With the weaker interactions being in the “‘open’ assembly", it causes more instability that results in a lower denaturing temperature and lower durability at high-speed centrifugation. The way that the two dimers assemble, creates an antiparallel β sheet composed of β sandwiches made from two β sheets.

=== Known active sites ===
While the focus has been on invertase in Saccharomyces, one of the known active sites is in the invertase in Bifidobacterium longum and is located within the β-propeller domain. The β-propeller domain is the inside the funnel created by five blades. Some amino acids to note are, Asp-54 and Glu-235, which are on the first strand of blades 1 and 4, along with Asn-53, Gln-70, Trp-78, Ser-114, Arg-180 and Asp-181 in the fructofuranoside ring.

== See also ==
- List of enzymes
