= -ose =

Suffix used in biochemistry

The suffix -ose (/oʊz, oʊs/) is used in organic chemistry to form the names of sugars. This Latin suffix means "full of", "abounding in", "given to", or "like". Numerous systems exist to name specific sugars more descriptively. The suffix is also used more generally in English to form adjectives from nouns, with the sense "full of", as in "verbose": wordy, full of words.

Monosaccharides, the simplest sugars, may be named according to the number of carbon atoms in each molecule of the sugar: pentose is a five-carbon monosaccharide, and hexose is a six-carbon monosaccharide. Aldehyde monosaccharides may be called aldoses; ketone monosaccharides may be called ketoses.

Larger sugars such as disaccharides and polysaccharides can be named to reflect their qualities. Lactose, a disaccharide found in milk, gets its name from the Latin word for milk combined with the sugar suffix; its name means "milk sugar". The polysaccharide that makes up plant starch is named amylose, or "starch sugar"; see amyl.

There are two predominant theories about the origin of the -ose suffix in chemistry:

1. Derived from glucose, an important hexose whose name came from Greek γλυκύς = "sweet".
2. Derived from sucrose, whose name came from Latin sucrum = "sugar" plus the common Latin adjective-forming suffix -ōsus; Latin sucrosus would mean "sugary".
