= Glucan 1,6-α-isomaltosidase =

Class of enzymes

Identifiers
- EC no.: 3.2.1.94
- CAS no.: 56467-68-6

Databases
- IntEnz: IntEnz view
- BRENDA: BRENDA entry
- ExPASy: NiceZyme view
- KEGG: KEGG entry
- MetaCyc: metabolic pathway
- PRIAM: profile
- PDB structures: RCSB PDB PDBe PDBsum
Search
- PMC: articles
- PubMed: articles
- NCBI: proteins

Glucan 1,6-α-isomaltosidase (EC 3.2.1.94, exo-isomaltohydrolase, isomalto-dextranase, isomaltodextranase, G2-dextranase, 1,6-α-D-glucan isomaltohydrolase) is an enzyme with systematic name 6-α-D-glucan isomaltohydrolase. It catalyses hydrolysis of (1→6)-β-D-glucosidic linkages in polysaccharides, to remove successive isomaltose units from the non-reducing ends of the chains

Optimum activity is on those 1,6-α-D-glucans containing 6, 7 and 8 glucose units.
