= Isomaltase =

Enzyme

Oligo-1,6-glucosidase

Identifiers
- EC no.: 3.2.1.10

Databases
- IntEnz: IntEnz view
- BRENDA: BRENDA entry
- ExPASy: NiceZyme view
- KEGG: KEGG entry
- MetaCyc: metabolic pathway
- PRIAM: profile
- PDB structures: RCSB PDB PDBe PDBsum
Search
- PMC: articles
- PubMed: articles
- NCBI: proteins

Isomaltase (EC 3.2.1.10) is an enzyme that breaks the bonds linking saccharides, which cannot be broken by amylase or maltase. It digests polysaccharides at the alpha 1-6 linkages. Its substrate, alpha-limit dextrin, is a product of amylopectin digestion that retains its 1-6 linkage (its alpha 1-4 linkages having already been broken down by amylase). The product of the enzymatic digestion of alpha-limit dextrin by isomaltase is maltose.

Isomaltase helps amylase to digest alpha-limit dextrin to produce maltose. The human sucrase-isomaltase is a dual-function enzyme with two GH31 domains, one serving as the isomaltase, the other as a sucrose alpha-glucosidase.

== Nomenclature ==
The systematic name of sucrase-isomaltase is oligosaccharide 6-alpha-glucohydrolase. This enzyme is also known as:

- Sucrase-alpha-dextrinase
- oligo-1,6-glucosidase,
- limit dextrin,
- so maltase,
- exo-oligo-1,6-glucosidase,
- dextrin 6alpha-glucanohydrolase,
- alpha-limit dextrin,
- dextrin 6-glucanohydrolase, and
- oligosaccharide alpha-1,6-glucohydrolase.

== Mechanism ==
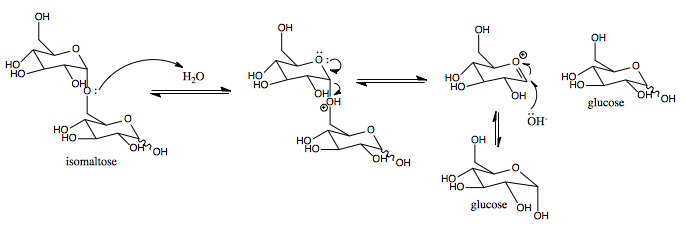
Mechanism for how sucrase-isomaltase catalyzes the conversion of isomaltose to two glucose molecules

This enzyme catalyses the following chemical reaction

Hydrolysis of (1->6)-alpha-D-glucosidic linkages in some oligosaccharides produced from starch and glycogen by enzyme EC 3.2.1.1.

Hydrolysis uses water to cleave chemical bonds. Sucrase-isomaltase’s mechanism results in a net retention of configuration at the anomeric center.
