= Fructoside =

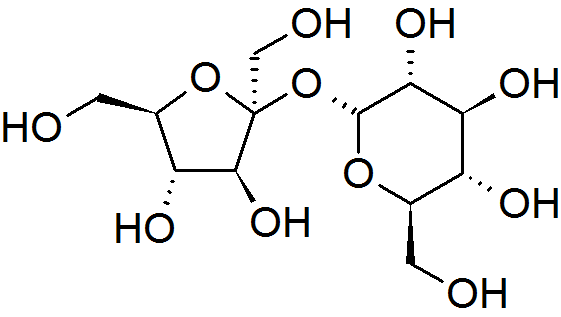
Sucrose, a common fructoside where glucose is bonded to fructose

Fructosides are glycosides that contain fructose. They are abundant in living organisms, food, and the environment. This makes them a particular interest in pharmacology and food science. C1 of fructose may be bonded to any organic moiety, forming a fructoside. The configuration of the fructoside can be denoted as an α-fructosidase or β-fructosidase depending on whether the organic moiety is bonded below or above the plane of fructose, respectively. The naming of fructoside-related enzymes also follows this nomenclature.

== Formation and cleavage ==
The formation of fructosides is catalyzed through enzymes called fructosyltransferases. These operate by transferring fructose to other organic moieties. This can be done repeatedly to make polymers or configure addition to diversify the molecule. Fructosyltransferases are most active in forming sucrose-derived fructosides and fructans.

The breakdown of fructosides is catalyzed through enzymes called fructosidases. A notable example is the breakdown of sucrose into glucose and fructose, which is catalyzed through a fructosidase called invertase. This is metabolically relevant since glucose and fructose are used as energy sources via glycolysis. Some fructosides are resistant to breakdown, such as fructans - a polymer of fructose with glucose at the end which serves as a dietary fiber and promotes probiotic growth.

== Research applications ==
Phlorizin structure

The formation of fructosides via fructosyltransferases can lead to drastic changes in the qualities of the target compound. Phlorizin, a naturally occurring glycoside that lowers blood sugar and thus has piqued medicinal interest, is a target of interest. Phlorizin fructoside derivatives have a higher solubility than their phlorizin counterparts, increasing bioavailability. The role of fructosides in promoting microbiome health possibly can be used in tandem with phlorizin's blood-sugar reducing properties as well.
