= Isomaltose =

Names
- IUPAC names α-D-Glucopyranosyl-(1→6)-D-glucopyranose; 6-O-α-D-Glucopyranosyl-D-glucopyranose
- Other names O-α-D-glucopyranosyl-α[1-6]-α-D-glucopyranoside; Isomaltose; Brachiose

Identifiers
CAS Number	499-40-1
3D model (JSmol)	Interactive image
ChEBI	CHEBI:28189
ChemSpider	388333
ECHA InfoCard	100.007.164
MeSH	Isomaltose
PubChem CID	439193
UNII	67I334IX2M
- InChI: InChI=1S/C12H22O11/c13-1-3-5(14)8(17)10(19)12(23-3)21-2-4-6(15)7(16)9(18)11(20)22-4/h3-20H,1-2H2/t3-,4-,5-,6-,7+,8+,9-,10-,11?,12+/m1/s1 Key: DLRVVLDZNNYCBX-RTPHMHGBSA-N; InChI=1/C12H22O11/c13-1-3-5(14)8(17)10(19)12(23-3)21-2-4-6(15)7(16)9(18)11(20)22-4/h3-20H,1-2H2/t3-,4-,5-,6-,7+,8+,9-,10-,11?,12+/m1/s1 Key: DLRVVLDZNNYCBX-RTPHMHGBBU
- SMILES: O(C[C@H]1OC(O)[C@H](O)[C@@H](O)[C@@H]1O)[C@H]2O[C@@H]([C@@H](O)[C@H](O)[C@H]2O)CO

Properties
Chemical formula	C_{12}H_{22}O_{11}
Molar mass	342.297 g·mol^{−1}
- Except where otherwise noted, data are given for materials in their standard state (at 25 °C [77 °F], 100 kPa). verify (what is ?) Infobox references

Isomaltose is a disaccharide similar to maltose, but with a α-(1-6)-linkage instead of the α-(1-4)-linkage. Both of the sugars are dimers of glucose, which is a pyranose sugar. Isomaltose is a reducing sugar. Isomaltose is produced when high maltose syrup is treated with the enzyme transglucosidase (TG) and is one of the major components in the mixture isomaltooligosaccharide.

It is a product of the caramelization of glucose.

== See also ==
- Isomalt
- Isomaltase
- Maltose
