= Maltase =

Enzyme

Maltose

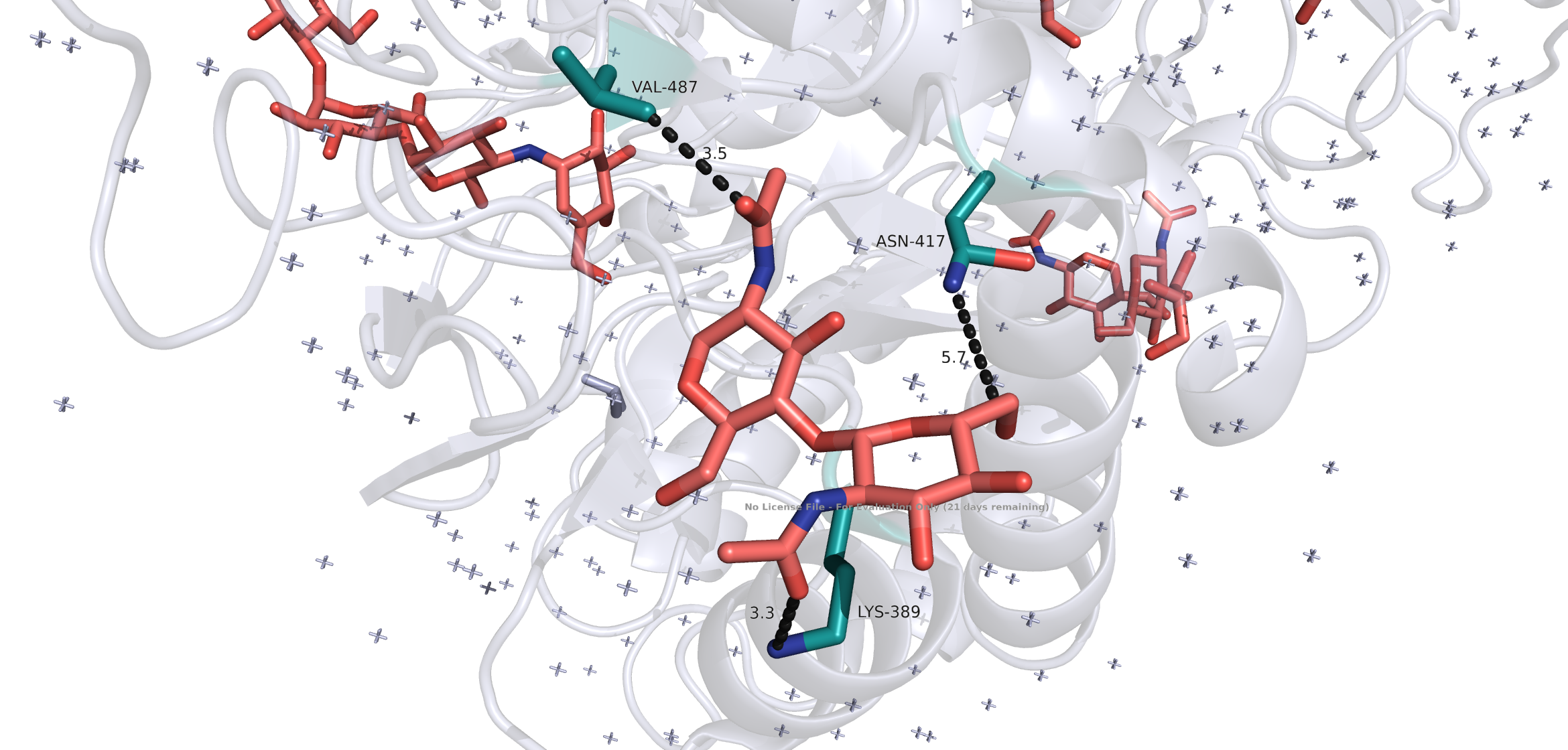
Ligand (NAG) interactions in Maltase-Glucoamylase

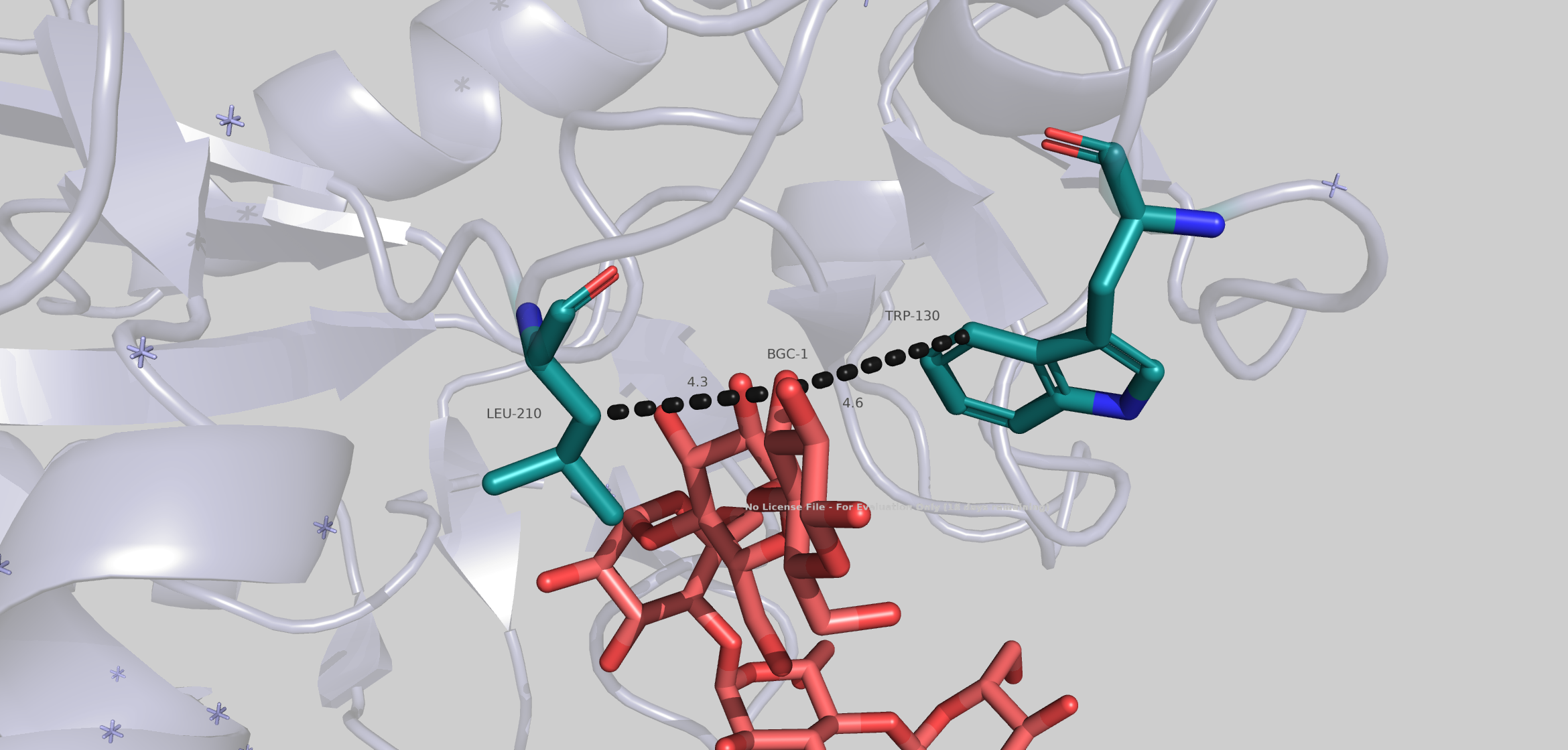
Interactions of oligosaccharides in Alpha-amylase

Maltase is an informal name for a family of enzymes that catalyze the hydrolysis of disaccharide maltose into two simple sugars of glucose. Maltases are found in plants, bacteria, yeast, humans, and other vertebrates.

Digestion of starch requires six intestinal enzymes. Two of these enzymes are luminal endo-glucosidases named alpha-amylases. The other four enzymes have been identified as different maltases, exo-glucosidases bound to the luminal surface of enterocytes. Two of these maltase activities were associated with sucrase-isomaltase (maltase Ib, maltase Ia). The other two maltases with no distinguishing characteristics were named maltase-glucoamylase (maltases II and III). The activities of these four maltases are also described as alpha-glucosidase because they all digest linear starch oligosaccharides to glucose.

== Structure ==
Maltases are members of a group of intestinal enzymes called FamilyGH13 (Glycoside hydrolase family 13) that are responsible for breaking apart the α-glucosidase linkages of complex carbohydrates into simple to use glucose molecules. The glucose molecules would then be used as a sort of "food" for cells to produce energy (Adenosine triphosphate) during Cellular respiration. The following are genes that can code for maltase:

- Acid alpha-glucosidase which is coded on the GAA gene is essential to breakdown complex sugars called Glycogen into glucose.
- Maltase-glucoamylase which is coded on the MGAM gene plays a role in the digestion of starches. It is due to this enzyme in humans that starches of plant origin are able to digested.
- Sucrase-isomaltase which is coded on the SI gene is essential for the digestion of carbohydrates including starch, sucrose and isomaltose.
- Alpha-amylase 1 which is coded on the AMY1A gene is responsible of cleaving α-glucosidase linkages in oligosaccharides and polysaccharides in order to produce starches and glycogen for the previous enzymes to catalyze. Higher quantities of this gene in the brain have been shown to lower the risk of Alzheimer's disease.

== Mechanism ==
Hydrolysis reaction of Maltose being broken at the 1-4 alpha-glucosidase linkage.

The mechanism of all FamilyGH13 enzymes is to break a α-glucosidase linkage by hydrolyzing it. Maltase focuses on breaking apart maltose, a disaccharide that is a link between 2 units of glucose, at the α-(1->4) bond. The rate of hydrolysis is controlled by the size of the substrate (carbohydrate size).

== Industrial applications ==
Alpha-amylase has an important function in degradation of starches, so it is used frequently in the baking industry. It is mostly used a means of flavor enhancing to improve bread quality. Without alpha-amylase, yeast would not be able to ferment.

Maltose-glucoamylase is commonly used as a fermentation source as it is able to cut starch into maltose, which is then used for brewing beers and sake.

Other than brewing, maltose glucoamylase has been studied by introducing specific inhibitors to stop the hydrolysis of the α-glucosidase linkages. By inhibiting the cleave of the linkages, scientists are hoping to devise a drug that is more efficient and less toxic to treating diabetes.

== History ==
The history of maltase discovery began when Napoleon Bonaparte declared a continental blockade in his "Berlin decree" in 1806. This initiated the search for alternative sources of sugar. In 1833 French chemists Anselm Payen and Jean-Francois Persoz discovered a malt extract that converted starch into glucose which they called diastase at the time. In 1880, H.T. Brown discovered mucosal maltase activity and differentiated it from diastase, now called amylase. In the 1960s advances in protein chemistry allowed Arne Dahlqvist and Giorgio Semenza to fractionate and characterize small intestinal maltase activities. Both groups showed there were four major fractions of maltase activity that were intrinsic to two different peptide structures, sucrase-isomaltase and maltase-glucoamylase. Fifty years later entering the genomic age, cloning and sequencing of the mucosal starch hydrolase confirmed Dahlqvist and Semenza's findings.

== Maltase deficiency ==
Acid maltase deficiency (AMD) also known as Pompe disease was first described by Dutch pathologist JC Pompe in 1932. AMD is a non sex linked autosomal recessive condition in which excessive accumulation of glycogen build up within lysosome vacuoles in nearly all types of cells all over the body. It is one of the more serious glycogen storage diseases affecting muscle tissue.

AMD is categorized into three separate types based on the age of onset of symptoms in the affected individual. Infantile (Type a), childhood (Type b), and adulthood (Type c). The type of AMD is determined by the type of gene mutation localized on 17q23. Mutation type will determine production level of acid maltase. AMD is extremely fatal. Type a generally die of heart failure prior to age one. Type b die of respiratory failure between ages three to twenty-four. Type c die of respiratory failure 10–20 years of the onset of symptoms.

== Comparative physiology ==
Vampire bats are the only vertebrates known to not exhibit intestinal maltase activity.

== See also ==
- Maltase-glucoamylase
- Sucrase-isomaltase
