= Sucrase-isomaltase =

Mammalian protein found in Homo sapiens

SI

Identifiers
- Aliases: SI, sucrase-isomaltase
- External IDs: OMIM: 609845; MGI: 1917233; GeneCards: SI
Available structures
PDB	Ortholog search: PDBe RCSB
PDB	List of PDB id codes 3LPO, 3LPP
Enzyme activity
EC #	BRENDA	ExPASy	KEGG	MetaCyc
3.2.1.10	↗	↗	↗	↗
3.2.1.48	↗	↗	↗	↗

Gene location (Human)
Chr.	Chromosome 3 (human)
Band	3q26.1	Start	164,978,898 bp
Band	3q26.1	End	165,078,496 bp

Gene location (Mouse)
Chr.	Chromosome 3 (mouse)
Band	3 E3|3 32.59 cM	Start	72,795,890 bp
Band	3 E3|3 32.59 cM	End	72,875,196 bp
RNA expression pattern
Bgee	Human / Mouse (ortholog); Top expressed in: jejunal mucosa; mucosa of ileum; mucosa of sigmoid colon; duodenum; sperm; rectum; testicle; epithelium of colon; mucosa of transverse colon; appendix / Top expressed in: duodenum; jejunum; ileum; colon; intestinal gland; crypt of lieberkuhn of small intestine; intestinal epithelium; intestinal villus; thymus; esophagus; More reference expression data
BioGPS	n/a
Gene ontology
Molecular function	sucrose alpha-glucosidase activity; oligo-1,6-glucosidase activity; hydrolase activity, hydrolyzing O-glycosyl compounds; catalytic activity; alpha-1,4-glucosidase activity; hydrolase activity; hydrolase activity, acting on glycosyl bonds; carbohydrate binding
Cellular component	integral component of membrane; plasma membrane; Golgi apparatus; apical plasma membrane; extracellular exosome; membrane; brush border
Biological process	polysaccharide digestion; metabolism; carbohydrate metabolic process
Sources:Amigo / QuickGO
Orthologs
Databases	NCBI: entry; OMA: entry
Species	Human	Mouse
Entrez	6476	69983
Ensembl	ENSG00000090402	ENSMUSG00000027790
UniProt	P14410	F8VQM5
RefSeq (mRNA)	NM_001041	NM_001081137
RefSeq (protein)	NP_001032	NP_001074606
Location (UCSC)	Chr 3: 164.98 – 165.08 Mb	Chr 3: 72.8 – 72.88 Mb
PubMed search
- Wikidata
View/Edit Human	View/Edit Mouse

Sucrase-isomaltase is a bifunctional glucosidase (sugar-digesting enzyme) located on the brush border of the small intestine, encoded by the human gene SI. It is a dual-function enzyme with two GH31 domains, one serving as the isomaltase, the other as a sucrose alpha-glucosidase. It has preferential expression in the apical membranes of enterocytes. The enzyme's purpose is to digest dietary carbohydrates such as starch, sucrose and isomaltose. By further processing the broken-down products, energy in the form of ATP can be generated.

== Structure ==
Sucrase-isomaltase consists of two enzymatic subunits: sucrase and isomaltase. The subunits originate from a polypeptide precursor, pro-SI. By heterodimerizing the two subunits, the sucrase-isomaltase complex is formed. The enzyme is anchored in the intestinal brush border membrane by a hydrophobic segment located near the N-terminus of the isomaltase subunit. Before the enzyme is anchored to the membrane, pro-SI is mannose-rich and glycosylated; it moves from the ER to the Golgi, where it becomes a protein complex that is N- and O- glycosylated. The O-linked glycosylation is necessary to target the protein to the apical membrane. In addition, there is a segment that is both O-linked glycosylated and Ser/Thr-rich. A similarly arranged enzyme is the maltase-glucoamylase, also a member of GH31.

Sucrase-isomaltase is composed of duplicated catalytic domains, N- and C-terminal. Each domain displays overlapping specificities. Scientists have discovered the crystal structure for N-terminal human sucrase-isomaltase (ntSI) in apo form to 3.2 Å and in complex with the inhibitor kotalanol to 2.15 Å resolution. Sucrase-isomaltase's mechanism results in a net retention of configuration at the anomeric center.

The crystal structure shows that sucrase-isomaltase exists as a monomer. The researchers claim that the observance of SI dimers is dependent on experimental conditions. ntSI's four monomers, A, B, C, and D are included in the crystal asymmetric unit and have identical active sites. The active site is composed of a shallow-substrate binding pocket including -1 and +1 subsites. The non-reducing end of substrates binds to the pocket. While the non-reducing sugar ring has interactions with the buried -1 subsite, the reducing ring has interactions with the surface exposed +1 subsite.

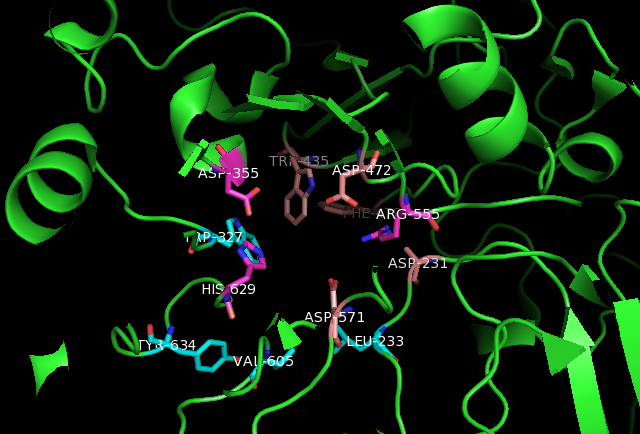
Key residues that interact with substrate where turquoise residues correspond to interactions with Man2GlcNAc2, pink residues correspond to interactions with kotalonal, and magenta residues corresponds to interactions with both Man2GlcNAc2 and kotalonal. Generated from 3LPO

The interactions between the active site of sucrase-isomaltase and the following compounds have been identified:

- Man2GlcNAc2 glycan: Within the active site, Man2GlcNAc2 hydrogen bonds with hydroxyl side chains of Asp231 and Asp571. Furthermore, hydrophobic interactions with Leu233, Trp327, Trp435, Phe479, Val605, and Tyr634 provide additional stabilization for Man2GlcNAc2.
- Kotalonal, the inhibitor: It interacts with the catalytic nucleophile Asp472 and acid base catalyst Asp571. In addition, ntSI residues His629, Asp355, Arg555, Asp231, Trp435, and Phe479 bind to the substrate.

Currently, there are no crystal structures of ntSI in complex with an α-1,6-linked substrate or inhibitor analogue. In order to predict isomaltose binding in sucrase-isomaltase structure, a model was produced by hand. Within the -1 subsite, isomaltose's non-reducing glucose ring was aligned to that of acarbose.

Not only has the structure of human sucrase-isomaltase been studied, but also sucrase-isomaltase's structure in sea lions and pigs have also been analyzed.

== Disease relevance ==
A deficiency is responsible for sucrose intolerance. Congenital sucrase-isomaltase deficiency (CSID), also called genetic sucrase-isomaltase deficiency (GSID), and sucrose intolerance, is a genetic, intestinal disorder that is caused by a reduction or absence of sucrase and isomaltase Explanations for GSID include:

- Mutations C1229Y and F1745C, which are present in the sucrase domain of SI, block SI's path to anchor in the cell's apical membrane but do not impact protein folding or isomaltase activity.
- Substitution of a cysteine by an arginine at amino acid residue 635 in the isomaltase subunit of SI was present in the cDNA encoding for a patient with CSID. SIC635R had an altered folding pattern, which influenced the sorting profile and increased the turnover rate.
- A factor that can be attributed to congenital sucrase-isomaltase deficiency is the retention of SI in the cis-Golgi. This inability to transport is a result of a glutamine to proline substitution at amino acid residue 1098 of the sucrase subunit.

Furthermore, a relationship between mutations in sucrase-isomaltase and chronic lymphocytic leukemia (CLL) has been identified. These mutations cause a loss of enzyme function by blocking the biosynthesis of SI at the cell surface.

== See also ==
- Sucrase
- Isomaltase
- Brush border
