= Sucrase =

Enzyme

Sucrases are digestive enzymes that catalyze the hydrolysis of sucrose to its component monosaccharides, fructose and glucose. One form, sucrase-isomaltase, is secreted in the small intestine on the brush border. The enzyme invertase, which occurs more commonly in plants, fungi and bacteria, also hydrolyzes sucrose (and other fructosides) but by a different mechanism: it is a fructosidase, whereas sucrase is a glucosidase.

== Types ==
- EC 3.2.1.10 is sucrase-isomaltase
- EC 3.2.1.48 is sucrose alpha-glucosidase

== Physiology ==
Sucrose intolerance (also known as congenital sucrase-isomaltase deficiency (CSID), genetic sucrase-isomaltase deficiency (GSID), or sucrase-isomaltase deficiency) occurs when sucrase is not being secreted in the small intestine. With sucrose intolerance, the result of consuming sucrose is excess gas production and often diarrhea and malabsorption. Lactose intolerance is a similar condition that reflects an individual's inability to hydrolyze the disaccharide lactose.

Sucrase is secreted by the tips of the villi of the epithelium in the small intestine. Its levels are reduced in response to villi-blunting events such as celiac sprue and the inflammation associated with the disorder. The levels increase in pregnancy, lactation, and diabetes as the villi hypertrophy.

== Use in chemical analysis ==
Sucrose is a non-reducing sugar, so will not test positive with Benedict's solution. To test for sucrose, the sample is treated with sucrase. The sucrose is hydrolysed into glucose and fructose, with glucose being a reducing sugar, which in turn tests positive with Benedict's solution..

== In other species ==
Cedar waxwings (Bombycilla cedrorum) and American robins (Turdus migratorius) have evolved to lose this enzyme due to their insectivorous and frugivorous diets. This absence produces digestive difficulty if challenged with unusual amounts of the sugar.
