= Glycoside hydrolase family 31 =

Glycosyl hydrolases family 31
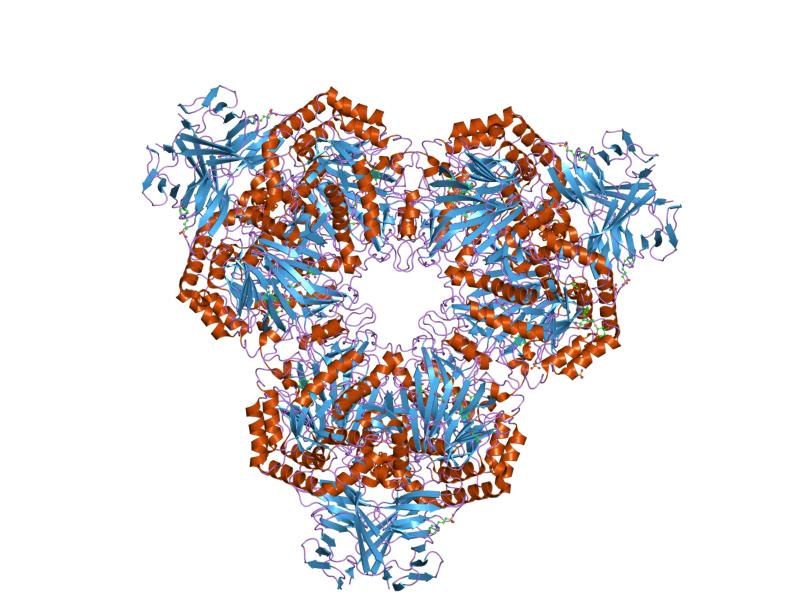
- structure of the yici thiosugar michaelis complex

Identifiers
- Symbol: Glyco_hydro_31
- Pfam: PF01055
- Pfam clan: CL0058
- InterPro: IPR000322
- PROSITE: PDOC00120
- CAZy: GH31
- Membranome: 523
Available protein structures:
- PDB: IPR000322 PF01055 (ECOD; PDBsum)
- AlphaFold: IPR000322; PF01055

In molecular biology, glycoside hydrolase family 31 is a family of glycoside hydrolases.

Glycoside hydrolases EC 3.2.1. are a widespread group of enzymes that hydrolyse the glycosidic bond between two or more carbohydrates, or between a carbohydrate and a non-carbohydrate moiety. A classification system for glycoside hydrolases, based on sequence similarity, has led to the definition of >100 different families. This classification is available on the CAZy web site, and also discussed at CAZypedia, an online encyclopedia of carbohydrate active enzymes.

Glycoside hydrolase family 31 CAZY GH_31 comprises enzymes with several known activities; alpha-glucosidase (EC 3.2.1.20), alpha-galactosidase (EC 3.2.1.22); glucoamylase (EC 3.2.1.3), sucrase-isomaltase (EC 3.2.1.48) (EC 3.2.1.10); alpha-xylosidase (EC 3.2.1); alpha-glucan lyase (EC 4.2.2.13).

Glycoside hydrolase family 31 groups a number of glycosyl hydrolases on the basis of sequence similarities An aspartic acid has been implicated in the catalytic activity of sucrase, isomaltase, and lysosomal alpha-glucosidase.
