= Α-N-acetylgalactosaminidase =

Class of enzymes

α-N-Acetylgalactosaminidase

Identifiers
- EC no.: 3.2.1.49
- CAS no.: 9075-63-2

Databases
- BRENDA: enzyme data
- ExPASy: NiceZyme view
- KEGG: enzyme entry
- MetaCyc: metabolic pathway
- Rhea: reactions
- PDB structures: RCSB PDB PDBe PDBsum
Search
- PMC: articles
- PubMed: articles
- NCBI: proteins

α-N-acetylgalactosaminidase (EC 3.2.1.49) is a glycoside hydrolase from bacteria and animals, also known as nagalase.

The human gene that codes for this enzyme is NAGA. Mutations in this gene and the deficiency in α-N-acetylgalactosaminidase activity have been identified as the cause of Schindler disease.

Enzymes with this activity is useful for converting type A blood to type O, giving it the name of A-zyme. Bacterial enzymes in the GH109 family, including the A-zyme from Elizabethkingia meningoseptica, runs this reaction efficiently.

Nagalase catalyzes the deglycosylation of the Gc protein also known as vitamin D3 binding protein rendering it incapable of being converted to the regulatory protein, Gc Macrophage Activating Factor, a protein involved in the activation of macrophages — in cases when many types of incompatible cells happen to be around, thus nagalase diminishes the body’s macrophage activating capacity, and elevated nagalase has been reported in systemic disorders including systemic lupus erythematosus. Elevated nagalase levels have also been found in the blood of children with autism and autism spectrum disorders. Nagalase accumulates in the serum of cancer patients and its activity correlates with tumor burden, aggressiveness and clinical disease progression.
