= Schindler disease =

- Other names: NAGA deficiency
- Schindler disease is inherited via an autosomal recessive manner
- Specialty: Endocrinology

Schindler disease, also known as Kanzaki disease and alpha-N-acetylgalactosaminidase deficiency, is a rare disease found in humans. This lysosomal storage disorder is caused by a deficiency in the enzyme alpha-NAGA (alpha-N-acetylgalactosaminidase), attributable to mutations in the NAGA gene on chromosome 22, which leads to excessive lysosomal accumulation of glycoproteins. A deficiency of the alpha-NAGA enzyme leads to an accumulation of glycosphingolipids throughout the body. This accumulation of sugars gives rise to the clinical features associated with this disorder. Schindler disease is an autosomal recessive disorder, meaning that one must inherit an abnormal allele from both parents in order to have the disease.

== Types ==
There are three main types of the disease each with its own distinctive symptoms.

Type I: infantile form, infants will develop normally until about a year old. At this time, the affected infant will begin to lose previously acquired skills involving the coordination of physical and mental behaviors. Additional neurological and neuromuscular symptoms such as diminished muscle tone, weakness, involuntary rapid eye movements, vision loss, and seizures may become present. With time, the symptoms worsen and children affected with this disorder will experience a decreased ability to move certain muscles due to muscle rigidity. The ability to respond to external stimuli will also decrease. Other symptoms include neuroaxonal dystrophy from birth, discoloration of skin, and telangiectasia or widening of blood vessels.

Type II: adult form, symptoms are milder and may not appear until the individual is in his or her 30s. Angiokeratomas, an increased coarsening of facial features, and mild intellectual impairment are likely symptoms.

Type III: is considered an intermediate disorder. Symptoms vary and can include to be more severe with seizures and intellectual disability, or less severe with delayed speech, a mild autistic-like presentation, and/or behavioral problems.

== Diagnosis ==
Amniocentesis or chorionic villus sampling can be used to screen for the disease before birth. After birth, urine tests, along with blood tests and skin biopsies can be used to diagnose Schindler disease. Genetic testing is also always an option, since different forms of Schindler disease have been mapped to the same gene on chromosome 22; though different changes (mutations) of this gene are responsible for the infantile- and adult-onset forms of the disease. The Genetic Testing Registry can be used to acquire information about the genetics tests for this condition.

== Management ==
Infants with Schindler disease tend to die within four years of birth; therefore, treatment for this form of the disease is mostly palliative. However, Type II Schindler disease, with its late onset of symptoms, is not characterized by neurological degeneration. There is no known cure for Schindler disease, but bone marrow transplants have been trialed, as they have been successful in curing other glycoprotein disorders.

== History ==
Schindler disease was named after Detlev Schindler (born 1946) M.D., the first author of a 1988 paper detailing the disease. It is also named after the Japanese biochemist and physician, Hiro Kanzaki (born 1949), who further studied it and released papers detailing the disease in 2006.

== See also ==
- List of cutaneous conditions
