= Maltose =

- α-Maltose α-Maltose

- β-Maltose β-Maltose

Names
- IUPAC names α-d-Glucopyranosyl-(1→4)-β-d-glucopyranose; 4-O-α-D-Glucopyranosyl-D-glucopyranose
- Systematic IUPAC name (3R,4R,5S,6R)-6-(hydroxymethyl)-5-{[(2R,3R,4S,5S,6R)-3,4,5-trihydroxy-6-(hydroxymethyl)oxan-2-yl]oxy}oxane-2,3,4-triol

Identifiers
CAS Number	69-79-4
3D model (JSmol)	Interactive image
ChEBI	CHEBI:17306
ChEMBL	ChEMBL1234209
ChemSpider	388469 α-maltose; 6019 β-maltose
ECHA InfoCard	100.000.651
EC Number	200-716-5
KEGG	D00044
PubChem CID	6255
UNII	66Y63L379N
CompTox Dashboard (EPA)	DTXSID101018093 DTXSID1023233, DTXSID101018093
- InChI: InChI=1S/C12H22O11/c13-1-3-5(15)6(16)9(19)12(22-3)23-10-4(2-14)21-11(20)8(18)7(10)17/h3-20H,1-2H2/t3-,4-,5-,6+,7-,8-,9-,10-,11?,12-/m1/s1 Key: GUBGYTABKSRVRQ-PICCSMPSSA-N; InChI=1S/C12H22O11/c13-1-3-5(15)6(16)9(19)12(22-3)23-10-4(2-14)21-11(20)8(18)7(10)17/h3-20H,1-2H2/t3-,4-,5-,6+,7-,8-,9-,10-,11?,12-/m1/s1; Key: GUBGYTABKSRVRQ-PICCSMPSSA-N
- SMILES: O([C@H]1[C@H](O)[C@@H](O)C(O)O[C@@H]1CO)[C@H]2O[C@@H]([C@@H](O)[C@H](O)[C@H]2O)CO

Properties
Chemical formula	C_{12}H_{22}O_{11}
Molar mass	342.297 g·mol^{−1}
Appearance	White powder or crystals
Density	1.54 g/cm^{3}
Melting point	160 to 165 °C (320 to 329 °F; 433 to 438 K) (anhydrous); 102–103 °C (monohydrate)
Solubility in water	1.080 g/mL (20 °C)
Chiral rotation ([α]_{D})	+140.7° (H_{2}O, c = 10)

Hazards
Safety data sheet (SDS)	External MSDS

Related compounds
Related	Sucrose; Lactose; Trehalose; Cellobiose
- Except where otherwise noted, data are given for materials in their standard state (at 25 °C [77 °F], 100 kPa). verify (what is ?) Infobox references

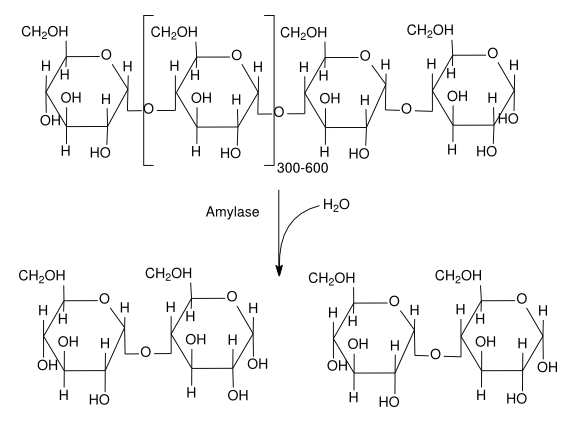
Amylase reaction consisting of hydrolyzing amylose, producing maltose

Maltose (/ˈmɔːltoʊs/ or /ˈmɔːltoʊz/), also known as maltobiose or malt sugar, is a disaccharide formed from two units of glucose joined with an α(1→4) bond. In the isomer isomaltose, the two glucose molecules are joined with an α(1→6) bond. Maltose is the two-unit member of the amylose homologous series, the key structural motif of starch. When beta-amylase breaks down starch, it removes two glucose units at a time, producing maltose. An example of this reaction is found in germinating seeds, which is why it was named after malt. Unlike sucrose, it is a reducing sugar.

== History ==
Maltose was discovered by Augustin-Pierre Dubrunfaut, although this discovery was not widely accepted until it was confirmed in 1872 by Irish chemist and brewer Cornelius O'Sullivan. Its name comes from malt, combined with the suffix '-ose' which is used in names of sugars.

== Structure and nomenclature ==
Carbohydrates are generally divided into monosaccharides, oligosaccharides, and polysaccharides depending on the number of sugar subunits. Maltose, with two sugar units, is a disaccharide, which falls under oligosaccharides. Glucose is a hexose: a monosaccharide containing six carbon atoms. The two glucose units are in the pyranose form and are joined by an O-glycosidic bond, with the first carbon (C_{1}) of the first glucose linked to the fourth carbon (C_{4}) of the second glucose, indicated as (1→4). The link is characterized as α because the glycosidic bond to the anomeric carbon (C_{1}) is in the opposite plane from the CH_{2}OH substituent in the same ring (C_{6} of the first glucose). If the glycosidic bond to the anomeric carbon (C_{1}) were in the same plane as the CH_{2}OH substituent, it would be classified as a β(1→4) bond, and the resulting molecule would be cellobiose. The anomeric carbon (C_{1}) of the second glucose molecule, which is not involved in a glycosidic bond, could be either an α- or β-anomer depending on the bond direction of the attached hydroxyl group relative to the CH_{2}OH substituent of the same ring, resulting in either α-maltose or β-maltose.

An isomer of maltose is isomaltose. This is similar to maltose but instead of a bond in the α(1→4) position, it is in the α(1→6) position, the same bond that is found at the branch points of glycogen and amylopectin.

== Properties ==
Like glucose, maltose is a reducing sugar, because the ring of one of the two glucose units can open to present a free aldehyde group; the other one cannot because of the nature of the glycosidic bond. Maltose can be broken down to glucose by the maltase enzyme, which catalyses the hydrolysis of the glycosidic bond.

Maltose in aqueous solution exhibits mutarotation, because the α and β isomers that are formed by the different conformations of the anomeric carbon have different specific rotations, and in aqueous solutions, these two forms are in equilibrium. Maltose can easily be detected by the Woehlk test or Fearon's test on methylamine.

It has a sweet taste, but is only about 30–60% as sweet as sugar, depending on the concentration. A 10% solution of maltose is 35% as sweet as a 10% solution of sucrose.

== Sources and absorption ==
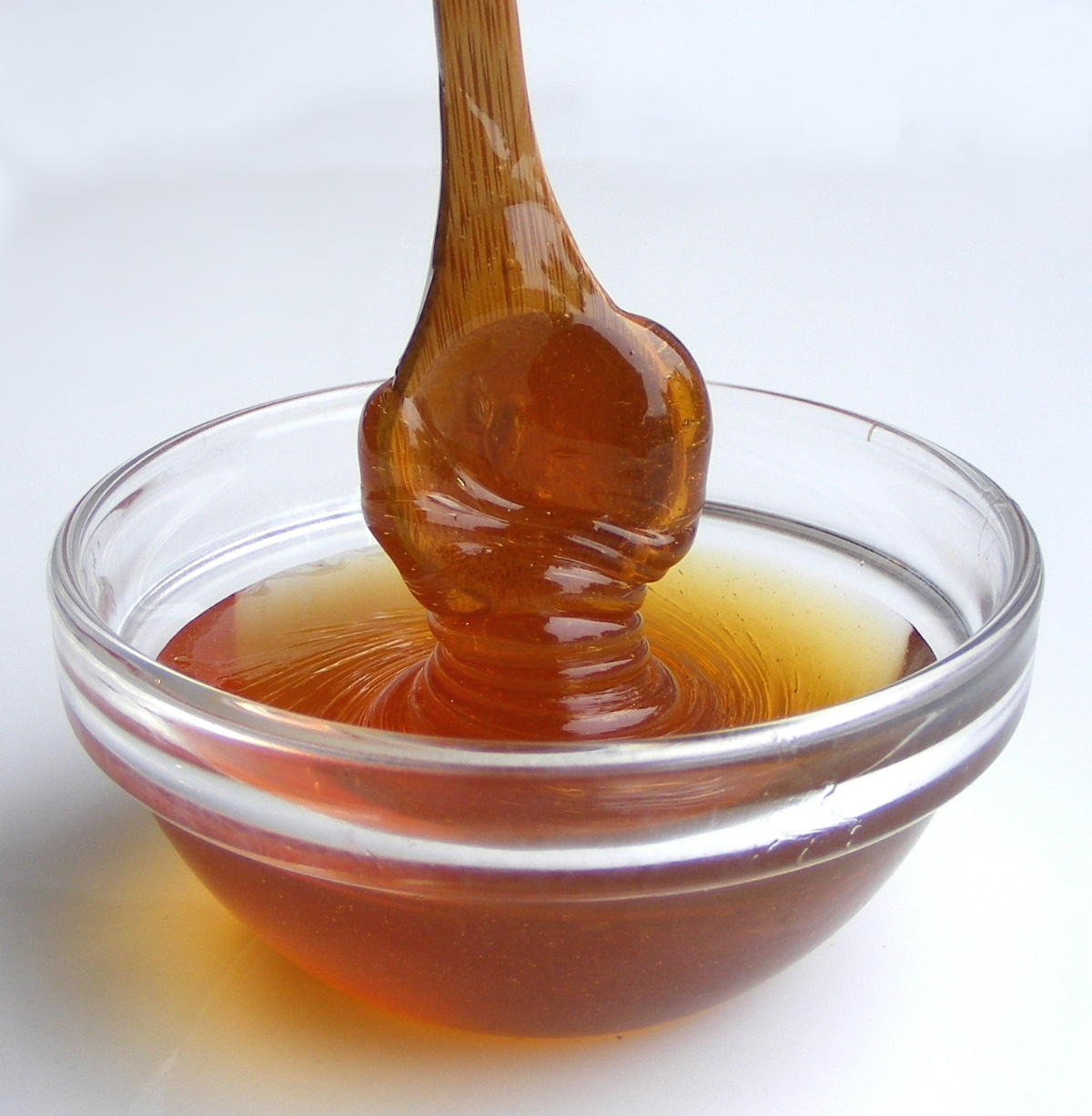
Maltose syrup

Maltose is a malt component, a substance obtained when the grain is softened in water and germinates. It is also present in highly variable quantities in partially hydrolyzed starch products like maltodextrin, corn syrup and acid-thinned starch.

Outside of plants, maltose is also (likely) found in honey.

In humans, maltose is broken down by various maltase enzymes, providing two glucose molecules that can be further processed: either broken down to provide energy, or stored as glycogen. The lack of the sucrase-isomaltase enzyme in humans causes sucrose intolerance, but complete maltose intolerance is extremely rare because there are four different maltase enzymes.

== Culinary uses ==
Maltose syrup is a key ingredient for char siu, a Cantonese-style barbecued pork, and is also used in other roasted meat marinades. In 1960s Hong Kong, maltose syrup sandwiched between two saltine crackers was a common street food due to its simplicity and low cost. In the present day, it is considered a nostalgic food and is mostly found at traditional food stalls in Hong Kong, Macau and Taiwan.
