= Sucrose =

Disaccharide made of glucose and fructose

- Haworth projection of sucrose

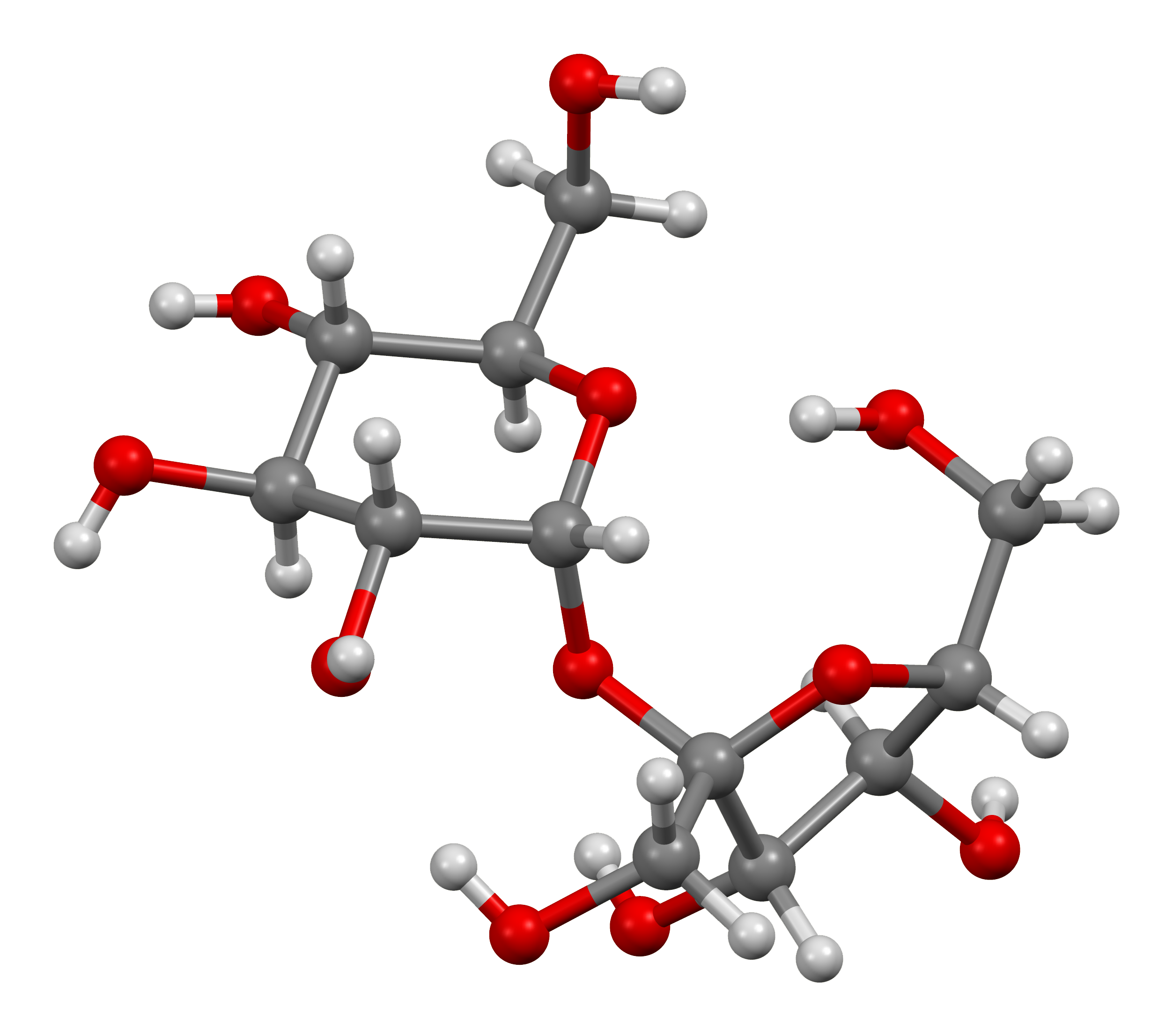
- Ball-and-stick model of sucrose

Names
- IUPAC name β-D-Fructofuranosyl α-D-glucopyranoside
- Systematic IUPAC name β-D-arabino-Hex-2-ulofuranosyl α-D-gluco-hexopyranoside(Systematic carbohydrate name) (2R,3R,4S,5S,6R)-2-{[(2S,3S,4S,5R)-3,4-Dihydroxy-2,5-bis(hydroxymethyl)oxolan-2-yl]oxy}-6-(hydroxymethyl)oxane-3,4,5-triol(Systematic substitutive name)
- Other names: Sugar; Saccharose; α-D-glucopyranosyl-(1↔2)-β-D-fructofuranoside; β-D-fructofuranosyl-(2↔1)-α-D-glucopyranoside; β-(2S,3S,4S,5R)-fructofuranosyl-α-(1R,2R,3S,4S,5R)-glucopyranoside; α-(1R,2R,3S,4S,5R)-glucopyranosyl-β-(2S,3S,4S,5R)-fructofuranoside; Dodecacarbon monodecahydrate; ((2R,3R,4S,5S,6R)-2-[(2S,3S,4S,5R)-3,4-dihydroxy-2,5-bis(hydroxymethyl)oxapent-2-yl]oxy-6-(hydroxymethyl)oxahexane-3,4,5-triol)

Identifiers
CAS Number	57-50-1
3D model (JSmol)	Interactive image
ChEBI	CHEBI:17992
ChEMBL	ChEMBL253582
ChemSpider	5768
DrugBank	DB02772
ECHA InfoCard	100.000.304
EC Number	200-334-9
IUPHAR/BPS	5411
KEGG	C00089
PubChem CID	5988
RTECS number	WN6500000
UNII	C151H8M554
CompTox Dashboard (EPA)	DTXSID2021288
- InChI: InChI=1S/C12H22O11/c13-1-4-6(16)8(18)9(19)11(21-4)23-12(3-15)10(20)7(17)5(2-14)22-12/h4-11,13-20H,1-3H2/t4-,5-,6-,7-,8+,9-,10+,11-,12+/m1/s1 Key: CZMRCDWAGMRECN-UGDNZRGBSA-N; InChI=1/C12H22O11/c13-1-4-6(16)8(18)9(264115619)11(21-4)23-12(3-15)10(20)7(17)5(2-14)22-12/h4-11,13-20H,1-3H2/t4-,5-,6-,7-,8+,9-,10+,11-,12+/m1/s1
- SMILES: O1[C@H](CO)[C@@H](O)[C@H](O)[C@@H](O)[C@H]1O[C@@]2(O[C@@H]([C@@H](O)[C@@H]2O)CO)CO

Properties
Chemical formula	C_{12}H_{22}O_{11}
Molar mass	342.297 g·mol^{−1}
Appearance	Colourless crystals or white powder
Density	1.587 g/cm^{3} (0.0573 lb/cu in), solid
Melting point	189 °C (372 °F; 462 K)
Solubility in water	2.01 g/mL (20 °C (68 °F))
log P	−3.76

Structure
Crystal structure	Monoclinic
Space group	P2_{1}

Thermochemistry
Std enthalpy of formation (Δ_{f}H^{⦵}_{298})	−2,226.1 kJ/mol (−532.1 kcal/mol)
Std enthalpy of combustion (Δ_{c}H^{⦵}_{298})	1,349.6 kcal/mol (5,647 kJ/mol) (Higher heating value)

Hazards
NFPA 704 (fire diamond)	0 1 0
- Lethal dose or concentration (LD, LC)
LD_{50} (median dose)	29700 mg/kg (oral, rat)
- NIOSH (US health exposure limits)
PEL (Permissible)	TWA 15 mg/m^{3} (total) TWA 5 mg/m^{3} (resp)
REL (Recommended)	TWA 10 mg/m^{3} (total) TWA 5 mg/m^{3} (resp)
IDLH (Immediate danger)	N.D.
Safety data sheet (SDS)	ICSC 1507

Related compounds
Related compounds	Lactose; Maltose
- Except where otherwise noted, data are given for materials in their standard state (at 25 °C [77 °F], 100 kPa). verify (what is ?) Infobox references

Sucrose (also called saccharose) is a disaccharide, a sugar composed of glucose and fructose subunits. It is produced naturally in plants and is the main constituent of white sugar. It has the molecular formula C_{12}H_{22}O_{11}.

For human consumption, sucrose is extracted and refined from either sugarcane or sugar beet. Sugar mills located in tropical regions near where sugarcane is grown crush the cane and produce raw sugar which is shipped to factories for refining into pure sucrose. Sugar beet factories are located in temperate climates where the beet is grown, and process the beets directly into refined sugar. The sugar-refining process involves washing the raw sugar crystals before dissolving them into a sugar syrup which is filtered and then passed over carbon to remove any residual colour. The sugar syrup is then concentrated by boiling under a vacuum and crystallized as the final purification process to produce crystals of pure sucrose that are clear, odorless, and sweet.

Sugar is often an added ingredient in food production and recipes. About 185 million tonnes of sugar were produced worldwide in 2017.

== Etymology ==
The word sucrose was coined in 1857, by the English chemist William Miller from the French sucre ("sugar") and the generic chemical suffix for sugars -ose. The abbreviated term Suc is often used for sucrose in scientific literature.

The name saccharose was coined in 1860 by the French chemist Marcellin Berthelot. In the anglo-saxon world saccharose is considered an obsolete name for sugars in general, especially sucrose.

== Physical and chemical properties ==
=== Structure ===
Sucrose's IUPAC name is β-D-fructofuranosyl-(2→1)-α-D-glucopyranoside. In this disaccharide, glucose and fructose are linked via a glycosidic linkage, i.e. an ether bond between C1 on the glucosyl subunit and C2 on the fructosyl unit. Glucose exists predominantly as a mixture of α and β "pyranose" anomers, but sucrose has only the α form. Fructose exists as a mixture of five tautomers but sucrose has only the β-D-fructofuranose form. Unlike most disaccharides, the glycosidic bond in sucrose is formed between the reducing ends of both glucose and fructose, and not between the reducing end of one and the non-reducing end of the other. This linkage inhibits further bonding to other saccharide units, and prevents sucrose from spontaneously reacting with cellular and circulatory macromolecules in the manner that glucose and other reducing sugars do. Since sucrose contains no anomeric hydroxyl groups, it is classified as a non-reducing sugar.

Sucrose crystallizes in the monoclinic space group P2_{1} with room-temperature lattice parameters a = 1.08631 nm, b = 0.87044 nm, c = 0.77624 nm, β = 102.938°.

=== Thermal and oxidative degradation ===
Pure crystalline sucrose melts at approximately 189 °C (372 °F). However, the melting point is highly sensitive to the presence of water and impurities such as mineral salts, and sucrose also begins to decompose at a lower temperature than its melting point. The decomposition of sucrose is exploited in cookery to form caramel.

Like other carbohydrates, sucrose combusts to carbon dioxide and water by the simplified equation:

C_{12}H_{22}O_{11} + 12 O_{2} → 12 CO_{2} + 11 H_{2}O

Mixing sucrose with the oxidizer potassium nitrate produces a fuel called rocket candy that is often used to propel amateur rocket motors.

C_{12}H_{22}O_{11} + 6 KNO_{3} → 9 CO + 3 N_{2} + 11 H_{2}O + 3 K_{2}CO_{3}

This reaction is somewhat simplified though. Some of the carbon does get fully oxidized to carbon dioxide, and other reactions, such as the water-gas shift reaction also take place. A more accurate theoretical equation is:

C_{12}H_{22}O_{11} + 6.288 KNO_{3} → 3.796 CO_{2} + 5.205 CO + 7.794 H_{2}O + 3.065 H_{2} + 3.143 N_{2} + 2.988 K_{2}CO_{3} + 0.274 KOH

Sucrose burns with chloric acid, formed by the reaction of hydrochloric acid and potassium chlorate:

8 HClO_{3} + C_{12}H_{22}O_{11} → 11 H_{2}O + 12 CO_{2} + 8 HCl

Sucrose can be dehydrated with concentrated sulfuric acid to form a black, carbon-rich solid, as indicated in the following idealized equation:

H_{2}SO_{4} (catalyst) + C_{12}H_{22}O_{11} → 12 C + 11 H_{2}O + heat (and some H_{2}O + SO_{3} as a result of the heat)_{.}

The formula for sucrose's decomposition can be represented as a two-step reaction: the first simplified reaction is dehydration of sucrose to pure carbon and water, and then carbon is oxidised to CO_{2} by O_{2} from air.

C_{12}H_{22}O_{11} + heat → 12 C + 11 H_{2}O

12 C + 12 O_{2} → 12 CO_{2}

Solubility of sucrose in water vs. temperature
T (°C)	S (g/dL)
50	259
55	273
60	289
65	306
70	325
75	346
80	369
85	394
90	420

=== Hydrolysis ===
Hydrolysis breaks the glycosidic bond converting sucrose into glucose and fructose. Hydrolysis is, however, so slow that solutions of sucrose can sit for years with negligible change. If the enzyme sucrase is added, however, the reaction will proceed rapidly. Hydrolysis can also be accelerated with acids, such as cream of tartar or lemon juice, both weak acids. Likewise, gastric acidity converts sucrose to glucose and fructose during digestion, the bond between them being an acetal bond which can be broken by an acid.

Given (higher) heats of combustion of 1349.6 kcal/mol for sucrose, 673.0 for glucose, and 675.6 for fructose, hydrolysis releases about 1.0 kcal (4.2 kJ) per mole of sucrose, or about 3 small calories per gram of product.

=== Synthesis and biosynthesis of sucrose ===
The biosynthesis of sucrose proceeds via the precursors UDP-glucose and fructose 6-phosphate, catalyzed by the enzyme sucrose-6-phosphate synthase. The energy for the reaction is gained by the cleavage of uridine diphosphate (UDP). Sucrose is formed by plants, algae and cyanobacteria but not by other organisms. Sucrose is the end product of photosynthesis and is found naturally in many food plants along with the monosaccharide fructose. In many fruits, such as pineapple and apricot, sucrose is the main sugar. In others, such as grapes and pears, fructose is the main sugar.

==== Chemical synthesis ====
After numerous unsuccessful attempts by others, Raymond Lemieux and George Huber succeeded in synthesizing sucrose from acetylated glucose and fructose in 1953.

=== Measurement ===
The purity of sucrose is measured by polarimetry, i.e., the rotation of plane-polarized light by a sugar solution. The specific rotation at 20 °C (68 °F) using yellow "sodium-D" light (589 nm) is +66.47°. Commercial samples of sugar are assayed using this parameter. Sucrose does not deteriorate at ambient conditions.

The sugar industry uses degrees Brix (symbol °Bx), introduced by Adolf Brix, as units of measurement of the mass ratio of dissolved substance to water in a liquid. A 25 °Bx sucrose solution has 25 grams of sucrose per 100 grams of liquid; or, to put it another way, 25 grams of sucrose sugar and 75 grams of water exist in the 100 grams of solution. A 25 °Bx solution therefore has a concentration of 25 mass % sucrose.

== Sources ==
In nature, sucrose is present in many plants, and in particular their roots, fruits and nectars, because it serves as a way to store energy, primarily from photosynthesis. Many mammals, birds, insects and bacteria accumulate and feed on the sucrose in plants and for some it is their main food source. Although honeybees consume sucrose, the honey they produce consists primarily of fructose and glucose, with only trace amounts of sucrose.

As fruits ripen, their sucrose content usually rises sharply, but some fruits contain almost no sucrose at all. This includes grapes, cherries, blueberries, blackberries, figs, pomegranates, tomatoes, avocados, lemons and limes. In grapes, for instance, during ripening the sucrose molecules are hydrolyzed (separated) into glucose and fructose.

== Production ==
Table sugar (sucrose) comes from plant sources. Two important sugar crops predominate: sugarcane (Saccharum spp.) and sugar beets (Beta vulgaris), in which sugar can account for 12% to 20% of the plant's dry weight. The plant material is separated to isolate the sucrose-rich portions. Purification of the sucrose exploits the good solubility of sucrose in water. After this aqueous extraction, a variety of tools and techniques allow further purification and production of solid forms suited for the markets.

== Culinary sugars ==
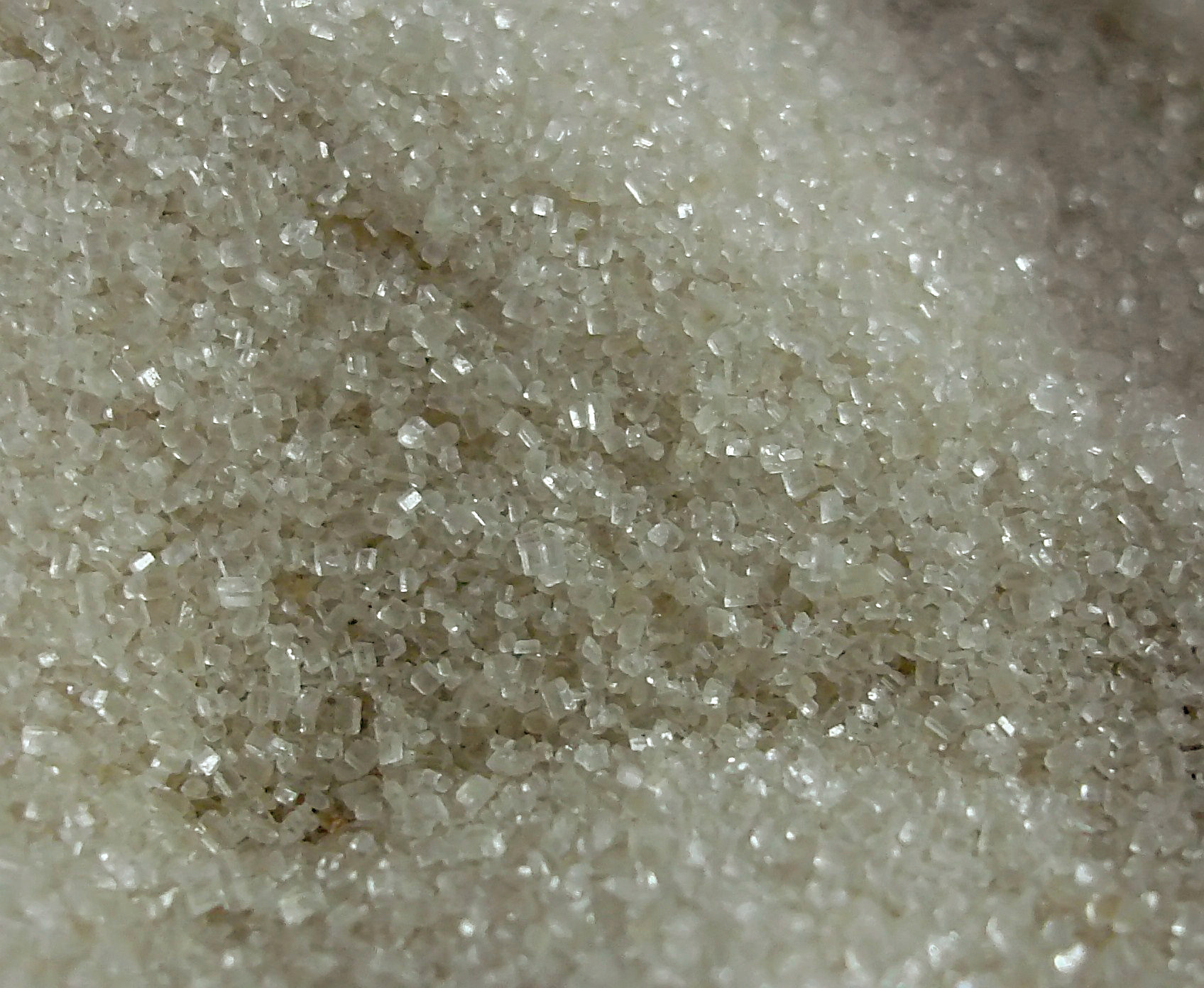
Grainy raw sugar

=== Mill white ===
Mill white, also called plantation white, crystal sugar or superior sugar is produced from raw sugar. It is exposed to sulfur dioxide during the production to reduce the concentration of color compounds and helps prevent further color development during the crystallization process. Although common to sugarcane-growing areas, this product does not store or ship well. After a few weeks, its impurities tend to promote discoloration and clumping; therefore this type of sugar is generally limited to local consumption.

=== Blanco directo ===
Blanco directo, a white sugar common in India and other south Asian countries, is produced by precipitating many impurities out of cane juice using phosphoric acid and calcium hydroxide, similar to the carbonatation technique used in beet sugar refining. Blanco directo is purer than mill white sugar, but less pure than white refined sugar.

=== White refined ===
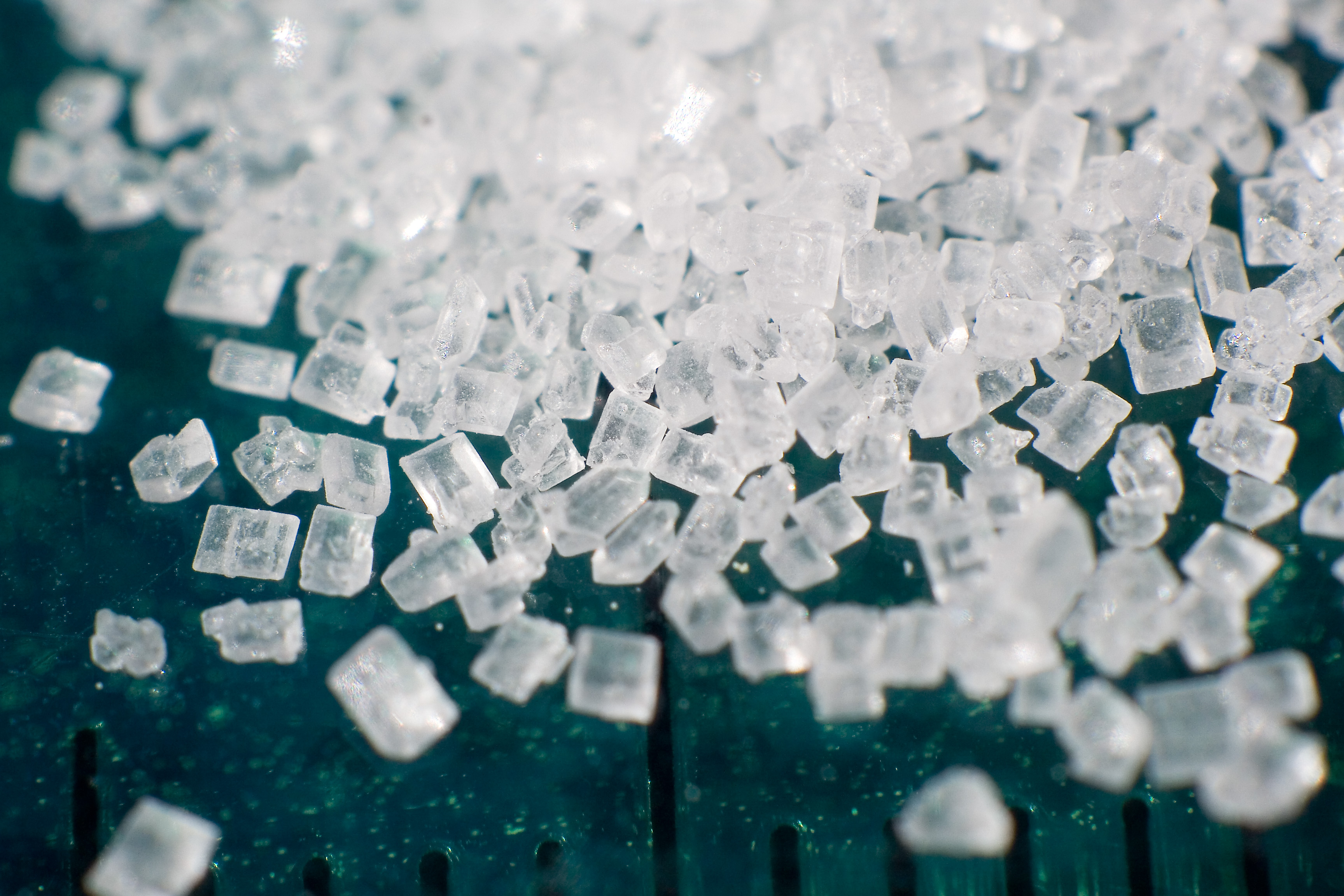
Grains of white sugar

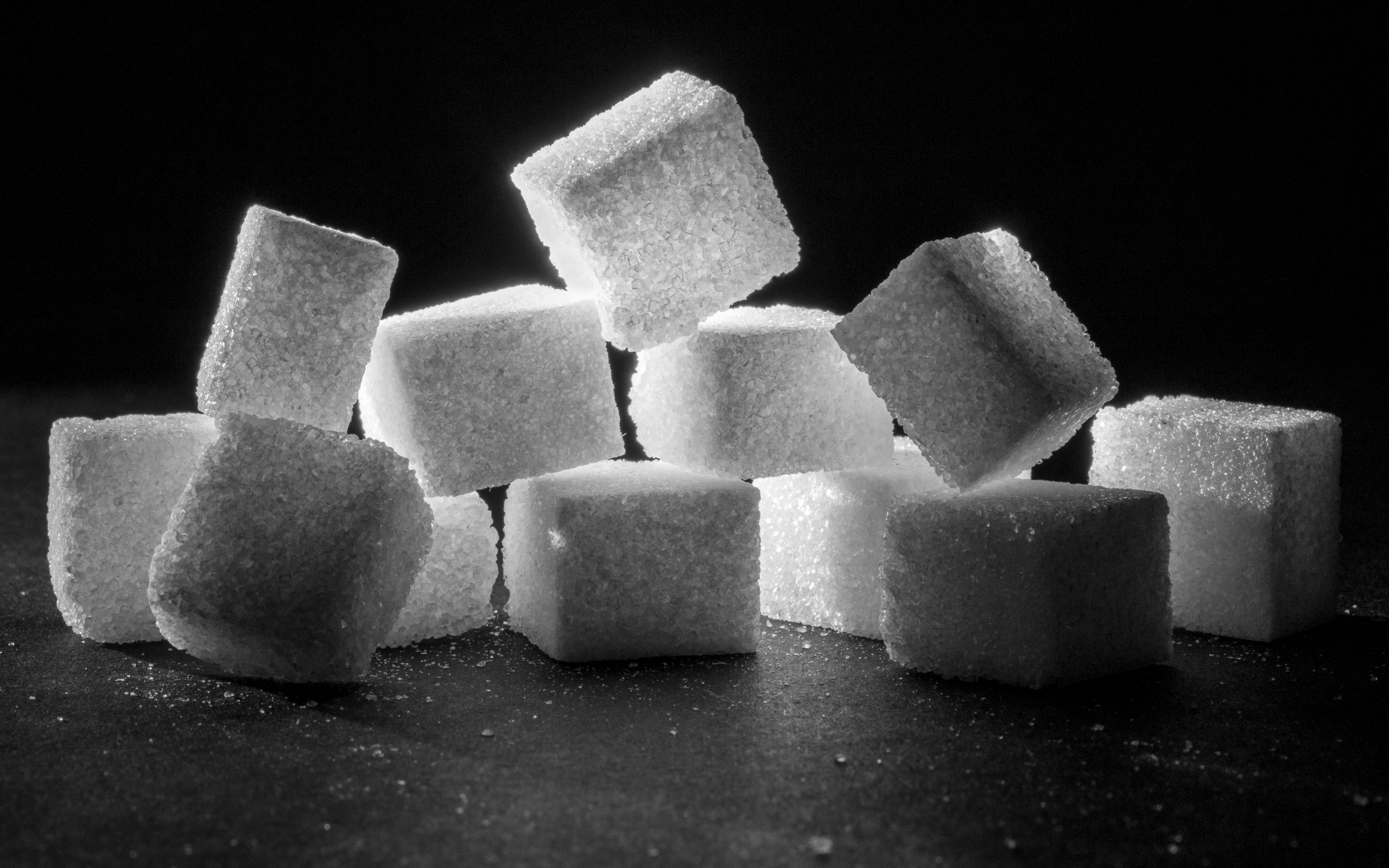
White sugar is often sold and used as cubes

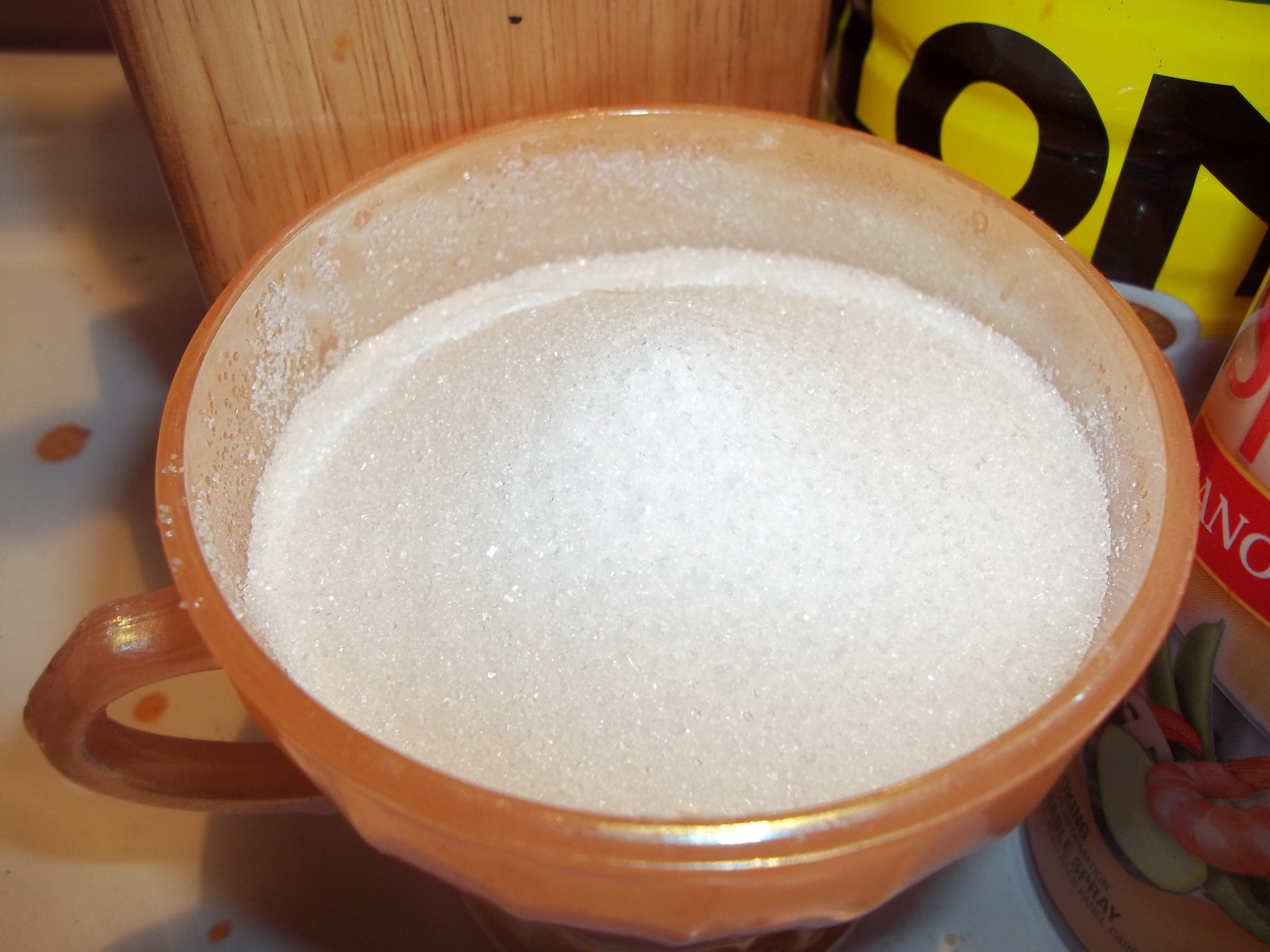
A bowl of table sugar

White sugar, also called table sugar or regular sugar, is a commonly used type of sugar, made either of beet sugar or cane sugar. It is nearly pure sucrose. The refining process completely removes the molasses from cane juice or beet juice to give the disaccharide white sugar, sucrose. It has a purity higher than 99.7%. Its molecular formula is C_{12}H_{22}O_{11}. White sugars produced from sugar cane and sugar beet are chemically indistinguishable: it is possible, however, to identify their origin through a carbon-13 analysis.

From a chemical and nutritional point of view, white sugar does not contain minerals (such as calcium, potassium, iron, and magnesium) present in small quantities in molasses. The only detectable differences are, therefore, the white color and the less intense flavor.

White refined sugar is typically sold as granulated sugar, which has been dried to prevent clumping and comes in various crystal sizes for home and industrial use:

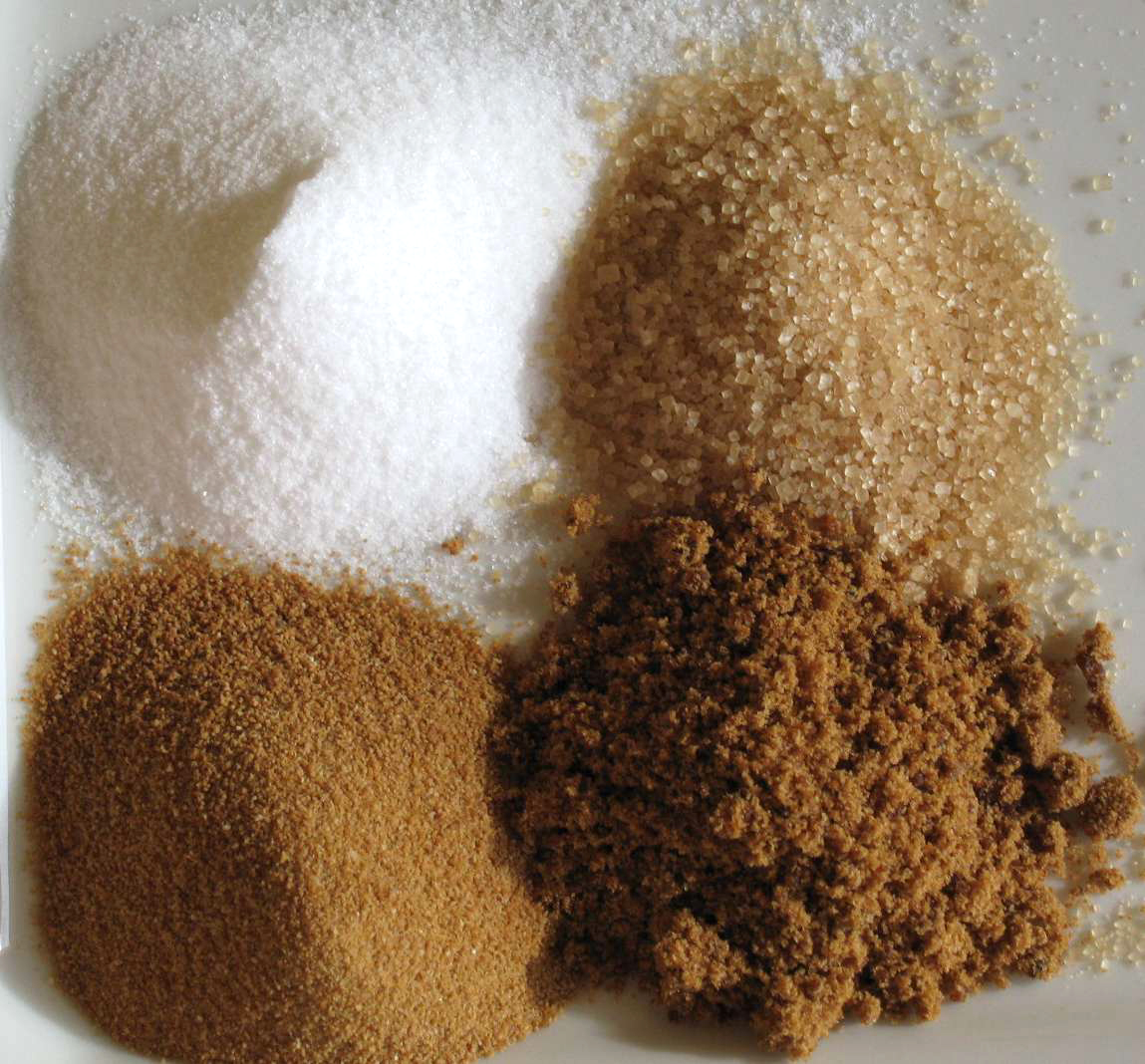
Sugars; clockwise from top left: Refined, unrefined, brown, unprocessed cane

- Coarse-grain, such as sanding sugar (also called "pearl sugar", "decorating sugar", nibbed sugar or sugar nibs) is a coarse grain sugar used to add sparkle and flavor atop baked goods and candies. Its large reflective crystals will not dissolve when subjected to heat.
- Granulated, familiar as table sugar, with a grain size about 0.5 mm across. "Sugar cubes" are lumps for convenient consumption produced by mixing granulated sugar with sugar syrup.
- Caster (0.35 mm), a fine white sugar with small grains favorable for cooking and baking. It is sold as "superfine" sugar in the United States and "berry" sugar in Canada. Additionally, it can be sold as "bar sugar", often in combination with a foaming agent, specifically for use in mixed drinks. Because of its fineness, it dissolves more quickly than regular white sugar and is especially useful in meringues and cold liquids. Caster sugar can be prepared at home by grinding granulated sugar for a couple of minutes in a mortar or food processor.
- Powdered, confectioner's sugar (0.060 mm), or icing sugar (0.024 mm), produced by grinding sugar to a fine powder. The manufacturer may add a small amount of anticaking agent to prevent clumping — either corn starch (1% to 3%) or tricalcium phosphate.

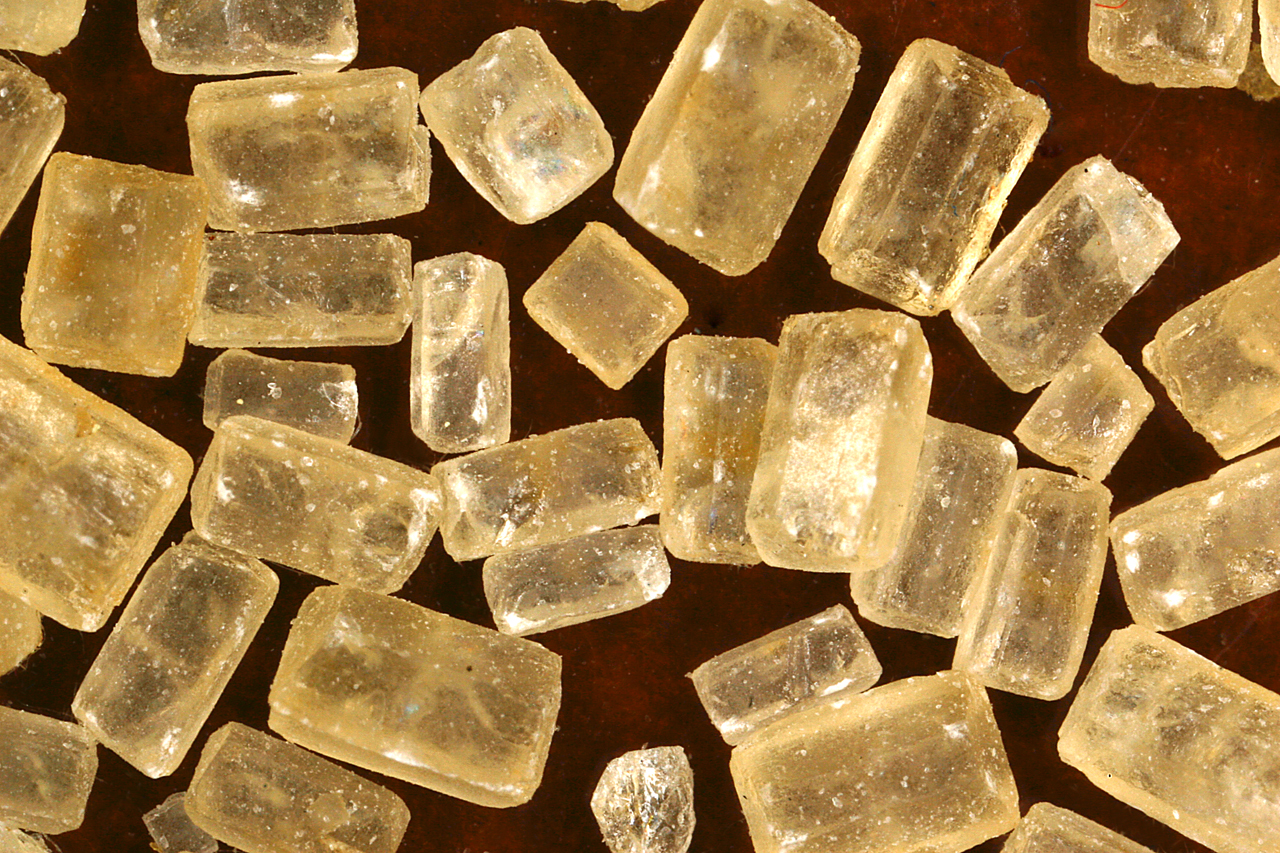
Brown sugar crystals

Brown sugar comes either from the late stages of cane sugar refining, when sugar forms fine crystals with significant molasses content, or from coating white refined sugar with a cane molasses syrup (blackstrap molasses). Brown sugar's color and taste become stronger with increasing molasses content, as do its moisture-retaining properties. Brown sugars also tend to harden if exposed to the atmosphere, although proper handling can reverse this.

== Consumption ==
Refined sugar was a luxury before the 18th century. It became widely popular in the 18th century, then graduated to becoming a necessary food in the 19th century. This evolution of taste and demand for sugar as an essential food ingredient unleashed major economic and social changes. Eventually, table sugar became sufficiently cheap and common enough to influence standard cuisine and flavored drinks.

Sucrose forms a major element in confectionery and desserts. Cooks use it for sweetening. It can also act as a food preservative when used in sufficient concentrations, and thus is an important ingredient in the production of fruit preserves. Sucrose is important to the structure of many foods, including biscuits and cookies, cakes and pies, candy, and ice cream and sorbets. It is a common ingredient in many processed and so-called "junk foods".

The overconsumption of sugar brings many health consequences, including heart disease, obesity and type 2 diabetes. The CDC recommends limiting daily sugar consumption to less than 200 calories worth (about 12 teaspoons/48 grams) on a 2000 calorie diet.

=== Nutritional information ===
Sugars, granulated [sucrose]
Nutritional value per 100 g (3.5 oz)
- Energy: 1,620 kJ (390 kcal)
- Carbohydrates: 100 g
- Fat: 0 g
- Protein: 0 g
Vitamins and minerals
Vitamins	Quantity %DV^{†}
Thiamine (B1)	0% 0 mg
Riboflavin (B2)	0% 0 mg
Niacin (B3)	0% 0 mg
Vitamin C	0% 0 mg
Minerals	Quantity %DV^{†}
Iron	0% 0 mg
Phosphorus	0% 0 mg
Potassium	0% 2.0 mg
Selenium	1% 0.6 μg
- Link to USDA Database entry
- ^{†}Percentages estimated using US recommendations for adults, except for potassium, which is estimated based on expert recommendation from the National Academies.

Fully refined sugar is 99.9% sucrose, thus providing only carbohydrate as dietary nutrient and 390 kilocalories per 100 g serving (table). There are no micronutrients of significance in fully refined sugar (table). Sucrose, as a pure carbohydrate, has an energy content of 3.94 calories per gram (or 17 kilojoules per gram).

=== Metabolism of sucrose ===
In humans and other mammals, sucrose is broken down into its constituent monosaccharides, glucose and fructose, by sucrase or isomaltase glycoside hydrolases, which are located in the membrane of the microvilli lining the duodenum. (In bacteria and some animals, sucrose is digested by the enzyme invertase.) The resulting glucose and fructose molecules are then rapidly absorbed into the bloodstream. Sucrose is an easily assimilated macronutrient that provides a quick source of energy, provoking a rapid rise in blood glucose upon ingestion.

=== Health effects ===
If consumed excessively, sucrose may contribute to the development of metabolic syndrome, including increased risk for type 2 diabetes, insulin resistance, weight gain and obesity in adults and children.

==== Tooth decay ====
Tooth decay (dental caries) has become a pronounced health hazard associated with the consumption of sugars, especially sucrose. Oral bacteria such as Streptococcus mutans live in dental plaque and metabolize any free sugars (not just sucrose, but also glucose, lactose, fructose, and cooked starches) into lactic acid. The resultant lactic acid lowers the pH of the tooth's surface, stripping it of minerals in the process known as tooth decay.

All 6-carbon sugars and disaccharides based on 6-carbon sugars can be converted by dental plaque bacteria into acid that demineralizes teeth, but sucrose may be uniquely useful to Streptococcus sanguinis (formerly Streptococcus sanguis) and Streptococcus mutans. Sucrose is the only dietary sugar that can be converted to sticky glucans (dextran-like polysaccharides) by extracellular enzymes. These glucans allow the bacteria to adhere to the tooth surface and to build up thick layers of plaque. The anaerobic conditions deep in the plaque encourage the formation of acids, which leads to carious lesions. Thus, sucrose could enable S. mutans, S. sanguinis and many other species of bacteria to adhere strongly and resist natural removal, e.g. by flow of saliva, although they are easily removed by brushing. The glucans and levans (fructose polysaccharides) produced by the plaque bacteria also act as a reserve food supply for the bacteria.

Such a special role of sucrose in the formation of tooth decay is much more significant in light of the almost universal use of sucrose as the most desirable sweetening agent. Widespread replacement of sucrose by high-fructose corn syrup (HFCS) has not diminished the danger from sucrose. If smaller amounts of sucrose are present in the diet, they will still be sufficient for the development of thick, anaerobic plaque and plaque bacteria will metabolise other sugars in the diet, such as the glucose and fructose in HFCS.

==== Glycemic index ====
Sucrose is a disaccharide made up of 50% glucose and 50% fructose and has a glycemic index of 65. Sucrose is digested rapidly, but has a relatively low glycemic index due to its content of fructose, which has a minimal effect on blood glucose.

As with other sugars, sucrose is digested into its components via the enzyme sucrase to glucose (blood sugar). The glucose component is transported into the blood where it serves immediate metabolic demands, or is converted and reserved in the liver as glycogen.

==== Gout ====
The occurrence of gout is connected with an excess production of uric acid. A diet rich in sucrose may lead to gout as it raises the level of insulin, which prevents excretion of uric acid from the body. As the concentration of uric acid in the body increases, so does the concentration of uric acid in the joint liquid and beyond a critical concentration, the uric acid begins to precipitate into crystals. Researchers have implicated sugary drinks high in fructose in a surge in cases of gout.

=== UN dietary recommendation ===
In 2015, the World Health Organization published a new guideline on sugars intake for adults and children, as a result of an extensive review of the available scientific evidence by a multidisciplinary group of experts. The guideline recommends that both adults and children ensure their intake of free sugars (monosaccharides and disaccharides added to foods and beverages by the manufacturer, cook or consumer, and sugars naturally present in honey, syrups, fruit juices and fruit juice concentrates) is less than 10% of total energy intake. A level below 5% of total energy intake brings additional health benefits, especially with regards to dental caries.

=== Medical uses ===
Sucrose is traditionally used as a mild short-acting analgesic for infants, allegedly working through an opiate response mediated by the sweet taste. It has an effect on noxious reactions to pain such as behavior and facial expression changes, but does not actually affect pain-related brain and spinal nerve activity, meaning that it probably does not actually reduce pain.

Sucrose-containing products are used as a quick way to raise blood sugar levels in the management of hypoglycemic episodes in diabetic patients. For example, one tablespoon of sucrose is considered acceptable by the CDC for managing such an episode. A 2010 randomized controlled trial found that a sucrose-based candy is as effective as more expensive glucose tablets at managing hypoglycemia in children with T1D.

=== Religious concerns ===
The sugar refining industry often uses bone char (calcinated animal bones) for decolorizing. About 25% of sugar produced in the U.S. is processed using bone char as a filter, the remainder being processed with activated carbon. As bone char does not seem to remain in finished sugar, Jewish religious leaders consider sugar filtered through it to be pareve, meaning that it is neither meat nor dairy and may be used with either type of food. However, the bone char must source to a kosher animal (e.g. cow, sheep) for the sugar to be kosher.
