= Glucanase =

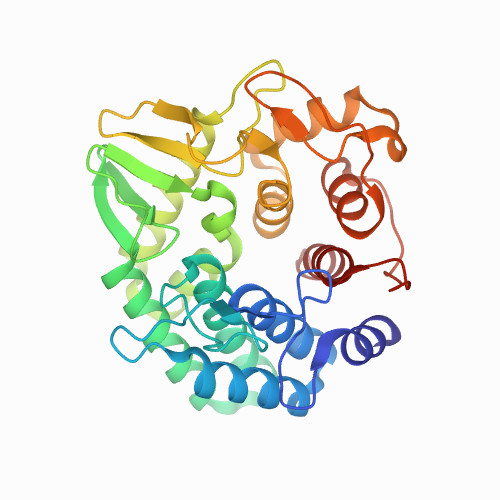
- 3D crystalline structure of the endoglucanase Cel10 from Klebsiella pneumoniae.

Identifiers
- EC no.: 3.2.1.
- CAS no.: 9015-78-5

Databases
- BRENDA: enzyme data
- ExPASy: NiceZyme view
- KEGG: enzyme entry
- MetaCyc: metabolic pathway
- Rhea: reactions
- PDB structures: RCSB PDB PDBe PDBsum
Search
- PMC: articles
- PubMed: articles
- NCBI: proteins

Glucanase

Identifiers
- Symbol: Eng1p
- CAS number: 9015-78-5
- PDB: 5GY3
- RefSeq: WP_012967086.1
- UniProt: A0A0J4VP90

Other data
- EC number: 3.2.1
Search for
- Structures: Swiss-model
- Domains: InterPro

Glucanases are enzymes that break down [glucans] polysaccharides via hydrolysis. The products of the hydrolysis reaction are smaller glucans, a linear or branched polysaccharide made of up to 1200 glucose monomers, linked by glycosidic bonds. Glucans are abundant in the endosperm cell walls of cereals such as barley, rye, sorghum, rice, and wheat. Glucanases are also referred to as lichenases, hydrolases, glycosidases, glycosyl hydrolases, and/or laminarinases. Many types of glucanases share similar amino acid sequences but vastly different substrates. Of the known endo-glucanases, 1,3-1,4-β-glucanase is considered the most active.

== Structure ==
=== β-glucanases ===
The secondary and tertiary structures of β-glucanases involve the stacking of multiple β-sheets, each of which are made of several anti-parallel strands that bend and form a cleft crossing the active site of the enzyme. This type of structure has been called the "jelly roll fold."

==== Some common β-glucanases ====
- 1,3-β-glucanases (laminarinases, EC 3.2.1.39)
- Endo-1,3(4)-β-glucanase
- β-1,3-glucanase, an enzyme in plants that breaks down β-1,3-glucans such as callose or curdlan
- β-1,6 glucanase, an enzyme that breaks down β-1,6-glucans
- Cellulase, an enzyme that perform the hydrolysis of 1,4-beta-D-glycosidic linkages in cellulose, lichenin and cereal β-D-glucans.
- Xyloglucan-specific endo-β-1,4-glucanase
- Xyloglucan-specific exo-β-1,4-glucanase

=== α-glucanases ===
- α-1,4-glucanase, an enzyme that breaks down α-1,4-glucans
- α-1,6-glucanase, an enzyme that breaks down α-1,6-glucans
- Pullulanase, a specific kind of glucanase that degrade pullulan

The functional formation of the enzyme-substrate complex is dictated by the induced-fit mechanism.

== Mechanism of Enzyme Action ==
The main function of glucanase is to catalyze the hydrolysis of glycosidic bonds in glucan polysaccharides. This function is sometimes not highly specific, and the enzymes distinguish among substrates mostly by the types of bonds present and α- or β- configuration.

In 1953, Dr. D. E. Koshland proposed a double-displacement mechanism for this enzyme action. The first step of his proposed mechanism is rate-limiting step independent of the concentration of the substrate and involves an amino acid nucleophile and an acid/base catalyst. In this step, the nucleophile, with help from the acid residue, displaces the aglycone and forms a covalent glycosyl-enzyme intermediate. The second step involves a water molecule, assisted by the conjugate base of the acid catalyst, rendering the free sugar while retaining an anomeric configuration of the molecule.

Glucanases can also catalyze transglycosylation, resulting in new β-glycosidic bonds between donor and acceptor saccharides. This reaction, which has the same region- and stereo-specificity as the hydrolysis reaction, involves either the direct reversal of hydrolysis (known as condensation) or kinetic control of a glycosyl donor substrate.

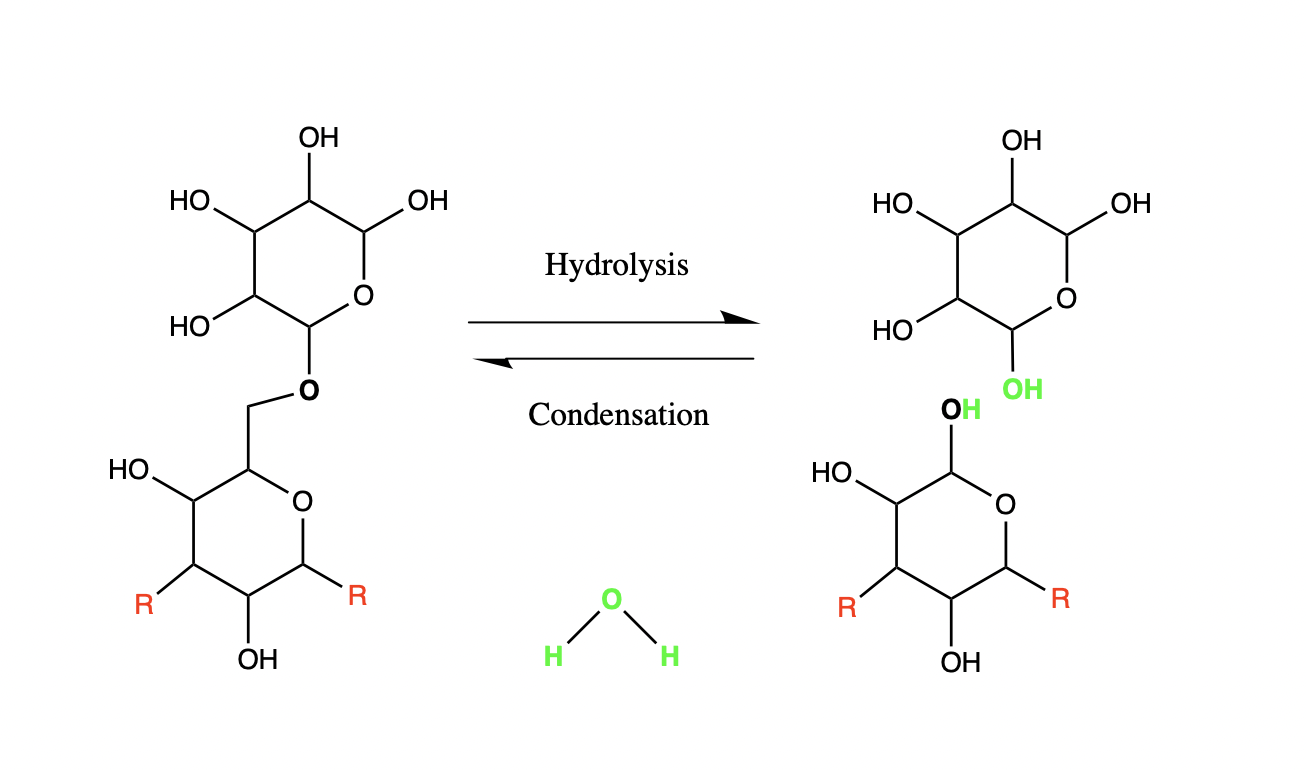
Glucanase enzymes catalyst the cleavage of glucoside bonds in large polysaccharides using water, resulting in smaller, more soluble polysaccharides. This process is reversible via condensation.

== Microbial Occurrence and Agricultural Significance ==
=== Microbial Production ===
Bacteria such as Escherichia coli, and Bacillus spp. produce 1,3-1,4-β-glucanases in order to degrade and use glucans from their environment as an energy source. These bacterial glucanases are an example of convergent evolution as they share similarity or relation with plant glucanases primary, secondary, or tertiary structure. Glucanases have also been found to be secreted by fungi such as Trichoderma harzianum, Saccharomyces cerevisiae and the anaerobic fungi Orpinomyces and Neocallimastigomycota, found in the digestive tracts of herbivores. T. harzianum is also used as a fungicide, which is linked to the ability of its β-gluanases to hydrolyze phytopathogenic fungi via a mycoparasitic attack.

=== Beer and Wine ===
Barley 1,3-1,4-β-glucanases are heat inactivated during malting, which can cause the build-up of high molecular-weight glucans which in turn result in reduced extract yield, lower filtration rates, and even gelatinous precipitates in the finished product. As a remedy, heat-resistant bacterial 1,3-1,4-β-glucanases are added.

Used in enological practices during the aging process of wine, particularly when aged on lees with microxygenation. The enzyme aids in autolysis of yeast cells to release polysaccharides and mannoproteins, which is believed to aid in the color and texture of the wine.

=== Livestock Feed ===
In the production of feedstuff for broiler chickens and piglets, it has been found that β-glucanases improve digestibility of barley-based diets.

== See also ==
- Glycoside hydrolases, a family of enzyme that cut a glycoside from a non-glycosidic molecule
- Glycoside hydrolase family 5
- Glycoside hydrolase family 16
- Glycoside hydrolase family 17
