= Chitosanase =

Enzyme

Identifiers
- EC no.: 3.2.1.132
- CAS no.: 51570-20-8

Databases
- IntEnz: IntEnz view
- BRENDA: BRENDA entry
- ExPASy: NiceZyme view
- KEGG: KEGG entry
- MetaCyc: metabolic pathway
- PRIAM: profile
- PDB structures: RCSB PDB PDBe PDBsum
Search
- PMC: articles
- PubMed: articles
- NCBI: proteins

Chitosanase (EC 3.2.1.132) is an enzyme with systematic name chitosan N-acetylglucosaminohydrolase. This enzyme catalyses the following chemical reaction

Endohydrolysis of beta-(1->4)-linkages between D-glucosamine residues (GlcN-GlcN) in a partly acetylated chitosan

A whole spectrum of chitosanases are known.

== Promiscuity ==
Chitosanases can be divided into four classes by the extent of their enzyme promiscuity:

1. Cleaves GlcNAc-GlcN and GlcN-GlcN;
2. Cleaves only GlcN-GlcN;
3. Cleaves GlcN-GlcNAc and GlcN-GlcN;
4. Cleaves a wide variety of β-glycosidic bonds except GlcNAc-GlcNAc (one that cleaves GlcNAc-GlcNAc would be instead considered a promiscuous endo-chitinase).

Under the CAZy classification of glycoside hydrolases, chitosanase activity mostly occurs in GH5, GH7, GH8, GH46, GH75, and GH80.

- GH5 is a very large family. Some promiscuous enzymes in this family digest both carboxymethyl cellulose (CMC) [or cellulose] and chitosan.
- GH7 is where most cellulases and cellulose 1,4-beta-cellobiosidases reside. A few cellulases/cellobiosidases in this family are additionally able to digest chitosan. No pure chitosanases have been identified in this family.
- Most of GH8 is promiscuous. Hydrolyzable substrates in addition to chitosan may include CMC, cellulose, lichenan, and (unspecified) β-glucan.
- GH46 is mostly specific to chitosan due to a conserved highly electronegative substrate-binding cleft, but one example that also digests cellulose has been found.
- GH75 and GH80 are only known to be specific.
