= C6H10O5 =

The molecular formula C_{6}H_{10}O_{5}, of molecular weight 162.14, may refer to:

- 3-Deoxyglucosone
- Diethyl pyrocarbonate
- Meglutol
- Levoglucosan
- Streptose

It is also the formula for the repeating unit of polymers of glucose:

- Starch
- Cellulose
- Glycogen
- the other glucans
