= CU =

CU or cu may refer to:

== Businesses and organizations ==
- CU (store), a chain of South Korean convenience stores
- Customs union, a type of intergovernmental trade bloc
- ChristianUnion, a political party in the Netherlands
- Christian Union (students), a university or college student Christian group
- Consumers Union, a non-profit organization based in the United States
- Credit union, a member-owned financial cooperative
- Cubana de Aviación (IATA airline designator CU)

== Science, technology, and mathematics ==
- Copper, symbol Cu, a chemical element
- Chemical formula of uranium carbide
- CU (power line), running between North Dakota and Minnesota, US
- cu (Unix utility), a remote login command
- ".cu", the filename extension for CUDA objects
- Callous and unemotional traits, in psychology
- Capacity Unit, the smallest addressable unit in Digital Audio Broadcasting
- Cellulase unit
- Control unit
- Compute unit, a measurement of AMD GPUs

== Universities ==
=== Africa ===
- Cairo University, Egypt
- Covenant University, Nigeria

=== Asia ===
- Chandigarh University, India
- Chang'an University, Xi'an, Shaanxi, China
- Chitkara University, Punjab, India
- Chittagong University, Bangladesh
- Chongqing University, China
- Christ University, India
- Chulalongkorn University, Thailand
- University of Calcutta, India

=== Australia ===
- Curtin University, Australia

=== Europe ===
- University of Cambridge, UK
- Cardiff University, UK
- Catholic University of Eichstätt-Ingolstadt, Germany
- Charles University, Prague, Czech Republic
- Cranfield University, UK
- Coventry University, UK

=== North America ===
- Cameron University, Oklahoma, US
- Carleton University, Ottawa, Canada
- Cedarville University, Ohio, US
- Chapman University, California, US
- Cheyney University, Pennsylvania, US
- Ciudad Universitaria, the main campus of the National University of Mexico
- Clarkson University, New York, US
- Clemson University, South Carolina, US
- Colgate University, New York, US
- Columbia University, New York, US
- Commonwealth University of Pennsylvania, US
- Concordia University (Montreal), Canada
- Cooper Union, New York, US
- Cornell University, New York, US
- Cornerstone University, Michigan, US
- Creighton University, Nebraska, US
- University of Colorado, US
  - University of Colorado Boulder (cf. Colorado Buffaloes, this school's athletic program)

== Other uses ==
- CheckUser, a MediaWiki extension
- Close-up, in film making
- Cuba (ISO 3166, FIPS Pub 10-4 and obsolete NATO digram)
  - .cu, Cuba's top-level domain country code
- Old Church Slavonic (ISO 639 alpha-2 language code)
- "See you", in e-mail shorthand
- Civil union, type of legal partnership
- Cubit, ancient unit of length
