= Avicelase =

Avicelase may refer to one of two enzymes:

- Cellulase
- Cellulose 1,4-beta-cellobiosidase
