= Laminaranase =

Laminaranase may refer to:

- Glucan endo-1,3-b-D-glucosidase, an enzyme
- Endo-1,3(4)-b-glucanase, an enzyme
