= Glycoside hydrolase family 7 =

Enzyme family

Glycosyl hydrolase family 7
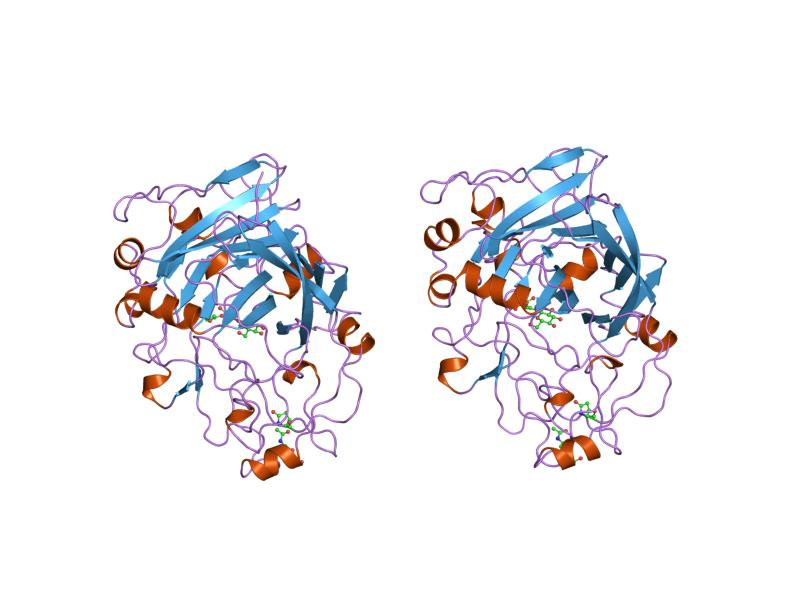
- endoglucanase i complexed with epoxybutyl cellobiose

Identifiers
- Symbol: Glyco_hydro_7
- Pfam: PF00840
- Pfam clan: CL0004
- InterPro: IPR001722
- SCOP2: 1cel / SCOPe / SUPFAM
- CAZy: GH7
- CDD: cd07999
Available protein structures:
- PDB: IPR001722 PF00840 (ECOD; PDBsum)
- AlphaFold: IPR001722; PF00840

In molecular biology, glycoside hydrolase family 7 is a family of glycoside hydrolases EC 3.2.1., which are a widespread group of enzymes that hydrolyse the glycosidic bond between two or more carbohydrates, or between a carbohydrate and a non-carbohydrate moiety. A classification system for glycoside hydrolases, based on sequence similarity, has led to the definition of >100 different families. This classification is available on the CAZy web site, and also discussed at CAZypedia, an online encyclopedia of carbohydrate active enzymes.

Glycoside hydrolase family 7 CAZY GH_7 comprises enzymes with several known activities including endoglucanase (EC 3.2.1.4) and cellobiohydrolase (EC 3.2.1.91). These enzymes were formerly known as cellulase family C.

Exoglucanases and cellobiohydrolases play a role in the conversion of cellulose to glucose by cutting the disaccharide cellobiose from the non-reducing end of the cellulose polymer chain. Structurally, cellulases and xylanases frequently consist of a catalytic domain joined to a cellulose-binding domain (CBD) via a linker region that is rich in proline and/or hydroxy-amino acids. In type I exoglucanases, the CBD domain is found at the C-terminal extremity of these enzyme (this short domain forms a hairpin loop structure stabilised by 2 disulphide bridges).
