= CDH =

CDH may refer to:

Organisations

- CDH Investments, a Chinese asset management firm
- Central DuPage Hospital, Illinois, U.S.A.
- Centre Démocrate Humaniste, a Belgian political party
- Cloudera's Distribution including Apache Hadoop
- Cretin-Derham Hall, school in St. Paul, Minnesota, U.S.A.

Concepts

- Commercial determinants of health
- Computational Diffie-Hellman assumption, that a certain mathematical problem is hard

Medical

- Congenital diaphragmatic hernia

Other

- Cellobiose dehydrogenase, a plant enzyme
