= Oligosaccharide 4-alpha-D-glucosyltransferase =

Class of enzymes

Identifiers
- EC no.: 2.4.1.161
- CAS no.: 9000-92-4

Databases
- IntEnz: IntEnz view
- BRENDA: BRENDA entry
- ExPASy: NiceZyme view
- KEGG: KEGG entry
- MetaCyc: metabolic pathway
- PRIAM: profile
- PDB structures: RCSB PDB PDBe PDBsum
Search
- PMC: articles
- PubMed: articles
- NCBI: proteins

In enzymology, an oligosaccharide 4-alpha-D-glucosyltransferase (EC 2.4.1.161) is an enzyme that catalyzes the chemical reaction in which the non-reducing terminal alpha-D-glucose residue is transferred from a 1,4-alpha-D-glucan to the 4-position of an alpha-D-glucan. This enzyme is useful in hydrolyzing oligosaccharides.

This enzyme belongs to the family of glycosyltransferases, specifically the hexosyltransferases. The systematic name of this enzyme class is 1,4-alpha-D-glucan:1,4-alpha-D-glucan 4-alpha-D-glucosyltransferase. Other names in common use include amylase III, and 1,4-alpha-glucan:1,4-alpha-glucan 4-alpha-glucosyltransferase.
