= Tapetum =

Tapetum (Latin for carpet or tapestry) can refer to:

- Tapetum (botany), tissue within the sporangium (especially the anther), which provides nutrition for growing spores . The innermost wall of microsporangium
- Tapetum lucidum, a reflective tissue layer associated with the retina of some vertebrates and spiders
- Tapetum of corpus callosum, a section of the corpus callosum in the brain
