= Glucan 1,4-β-glucosidase =

Identifiers
- EC no.: 3.2.1.74
- CAS no.: 37288-52-1

Databases
- IntEnz: IntEnz view
- BRENDA: BRENDA entry
- ExPASy: NiceZyme view
- KEGG: KEGG entry
- MetaCyc: metabolic pathway
- PRIAM: profile
- PDB structures: RCSB PDB PDBe PDBsum
Search
- PMC: articles
- PubMed: articles
- NCBI: proteins

The enzyme glucan 1,4-β-glucosidase (EC 3.2.1.74), also known as 4-β-D-glucan glucohydrolase, catalyses the hydrolysis of (1→4)-linkages in 1,4-β-D-glucans and related oligosaccharides, removing successive glucose units.

This is one of the cellulases, enzymes involved in the hydrolysis of cellulose and related polysaccharides; more specifically, an exocellulase, that acts at the end of the polysaccharide chain. Other names for this enzyme are exo-1,4-β-glucosidase, exocellulase, exo-β-1,4-glucosidase, exo-β-1,4-glucanase, β-1,4-D-glucanase, exo-1,4-β-glucanase, and 1,4-β-D-glucan glucohydrolase.

== See also ==
- β-glucosidase
