= 1,4-a-glucan 6-a-glucosyltransferase =

Class of enzymes

1,4-alpha-glucan 6-alpha-glucosyltransferase

Identifiers
- EC no.: 2.4.1.24
- CAS no.: 9030-12-0

Databases
- IntEnz: IntEnz view
- BRENDA: BRENDA entry
- ExPASy: NiceZyme view
- KEGG: KEGG entry
- MetaCyc: metabolic pathway
- PRIAM: profile
- PDB structures: RCSB PDB PDBe PDBsum
- Gene Ontology: AmiGO / QuickGO
Search
- PMC: articles
- PubMed: articles
- NCBI: proteins

In enzymology, a 1,4-alpha-glucan 6-alpha-glucosyltransferase (EC 2.4.1.24) is an enzyme that catalyzes the chemical reaction that transfers an alpha-D-glucosyl residue in a 1,4-alpha-D-glucan to the primary hydroxyl group of glucose or 1,4-alpha-D-glucan.

This enzyme belongs to the family of glycosyltransferases, specifically the hexosyltransferases. The systematic name of this enzyme class is 1,4-alpha-D-glucan:1,4-alpha-D-glucan(D-glucose) 6-alpha-D-glucosyltransferase. Other names in common use include oligoglucan-branching glycosyltransferase, 1,4-alpha-D-glucan 6-alpha-D-glucosyltransferase, T-enzyme, and D-glucosyltransferase.
