= Streptomyces roseolus =

Scientific classification
- Domain: Bacteria
- Kingdom: Bacillati
- Phylum: Actinomycetota
- Class: Actinomycetes
- Order: Streptomycetales
- Family: Streptomycetaceae
- Genus: Streptomyces
- Species: S. roseolus

Binomial name
- Streptomyces roseolus Pridham et al. 1958

Type strain
- AS 4.1872, AS 4.2005, ATCC 23210, ATCC 31047, BCRC 13778, CBS 559.68, CCRC 13778, CGMCC 4.1872, CGMCC 4.2005, DSM 40174, ETH 24181, IFO 12816, INA 5449 \\/54, INA 5449/54, ISP 5174, JCM 4411, KCC S-0411, KCCS-0411, LMG 20265, NBRC 12816, NCIMB 13022, NRRL B-5424, NRRL-ISP 5174, RIA 1086, UNIQEM 193, VKM Ac-848

Synonyms
- Actinomyces roseolus

Species of bacterium

Streptomyces roseolus is a bacterium species from the genus of Streptomyces which has been isolated from soil in Russia. Streptomyces roseolus produces chitosanase and isoflavones .

== See also ==
- List of Streptomyces species
