= Lichenase =

Licheninase

Identifiers
- EC no.: 3.2.1.73
- CAS no.: 37288-51-0

Databases
- BRENDA: enzyme data
- ExPASy: NiceZyme view
- KEGG: enzyme entry
- MetaCyc: metabolic pathway
- Rhea: reactions
- PDB structures: RCSB PDB PDBe PDBsum
Search
- PMC: articles
- PubMed: articles
- NCBI: proteins

Lichenase (EC 3.2.1.73), also known as licheninase or 1,3-1,4 ꞵ-D-glucanase, is an enzyme that hydrolyzes the β-1,4 glycosidic bond next to the β-1,3 bond in the polysaccharides lichenin and β-glucan. These polysaccharides are found in the cell walls of lichens and grains, respectively. In Bacillus species, lichenase is produced by the licA gene. Lichenase is a hydrolase, which means it uses water to cleave bonds. Specifically, lichenase is a glycosidase, or an enzyme that hydrolyzes O- and S-glycosyl compounds.

== Activity ==
Lichenase breaks the β-1,4 glycosidic bonds next to the β-1,3 bonds in mixed-linkage β-glucans in a reaction using water, known as hydrolysis. This is a double-displacement reaction, where a β-glucan combines with a water molecule and produces two products of either trisaccharides or tetrasaccharides. In Bacillus subtilis, these products are the oligosaccharides cellobiosyltriose and cellotriosyltetraose. These intermediary sugars can then be broken down further in order to produce energy for the organism. Lichenase performs differently from other β-glucanases, such as laminarinase and cellulase, due to its specificity in the bonds that it breaks, while the other β-glucanases act on bonds in other configurations. Certain lichenases specialize in glucans from specific sources. For instance, lichenase from Bacillus tequilensis showed an affinity for barley ꞵ-glucans, while lichenase from Bacillus amyloliquefaciens showed an affinity for oat ꞵ-glucans.

== Structure ==
The active site is a concave C-shaped cleft that allows β-glucans to bind. The active site has aromatic amino acid side chains on one wall, which are used to stabilize sugar ring stacking. The other wall has acidic residues, which are used to promote catalysis. The rigidity of the active site is minimally influenced by crystal contacts, so that even when lichenase is compacted, the active site still retains its shape.

The enzyme itself has a tertiary structure known as a jellyroll structure, which is composed of two antiparallel seven-stranded ꞵ-sheets sandwiched together, with a slight left-hand twist. These ꞵ-sheets are connected via a minor sheet, which displays both antiparallel and parallel bonding. This makes for a very stable enzyme, helping to prevent denaturation during high heat. The jellyroll structure also gives the enzyme strong resistance against mutations, as changes in its amino acid sequence had little effect on the enzyme's effectiveness.

== Organisms ==
Lichenase can be found in a variety of different organisms. Bacteria such as Bacillus subtilis, Bacillus licheniformis, Bacillus tequilensis, and Clostridium thermocellum produce lichenase and have been looked at for use in biotechnological applications. The fungus Aspergillus japonicus has its own lichenase that cleaves (1,4) bonds that precede (1,3) bonds in ꞵ-glucans. Grasses and cereals have lichenase to help depolymerize β-glucans in their cell walls. However, lichenase from plant species becomes inactive at higher temperatures, making their bacterial counterparts more useful in commercial applications. Lichenase has also been found in several sea star species, including Asterias forbesi and Pisaster ochraceus, which has been theorized to be used either to break down polysaccharides in algal species or to have been an evolutionary leftover from an ancestral echinoderm.

== Industrial applications ==
The licA gene has been isolated from B. subtilis, B. licheniformis, and other Bacillus species in order to be inserted into Escherichia coli cells. This has allowed lichenase to be used in the agricultural, food, and biofuel industries. Lichenase is a desirable enzyme in these industries as it has a tolerance for environments with varying pH and temperatures.

In the food industry, lichenase has been used to reduce viscosity in the brewing process of beer. β-glucans from barley have been known to cause precipitates and gel formation during the brewing process, slowing down filtration. The use of lichenase makes the filtration process faster and reduces cloudiness.

In the agricultural industry, lichenase has been used in animal feed. The use of β-glucanases has been found to improve the digestibility of the food pellets and reduces fecal stickiness for both chickens and piglets.

In the biofuel industry, lichenase has been found to be a key part of the enzyme portfolio used to make bioethanol and biodiesel. To take full advantage of the fermentable sugars available in grains, lichenase is needed to break down the hemicellulose polysaccharide found in lignocellulose, which can later be turned into biofuel.
