= Streptomyces viridobrunneus =

Scientific classification
- Domain: Bacteria
- Kingdom: Bacillati
- Phylum: Actinomycetota
- Class: Actinomycetia
- Order: Streptomycetales
- Family: Streptomycetaceae
- Genus: Streptomyces
- Species: S. viridobrunneus

Binomial name
- Streptomyces viridobrunneus Terekhova 1986

Type strain
- ATCC 43698, CGMCC 4.1771, DSM 41466, IFO 15902, INMI 300, JCM 9096, LMG 20317, NBRC 15902, NRRL B-24332, VKM 559, VKM Ac-559

Synonyms
- Actinomyces viridobrunneus

Species of bacterium

Streptomyces viridobrunneus is a bacterium species from the genus of Streptomyces. Streptomyces viridobrunneus produces cellulase.

== See also ==
- List of Streptomyces species
