= Laminarin =

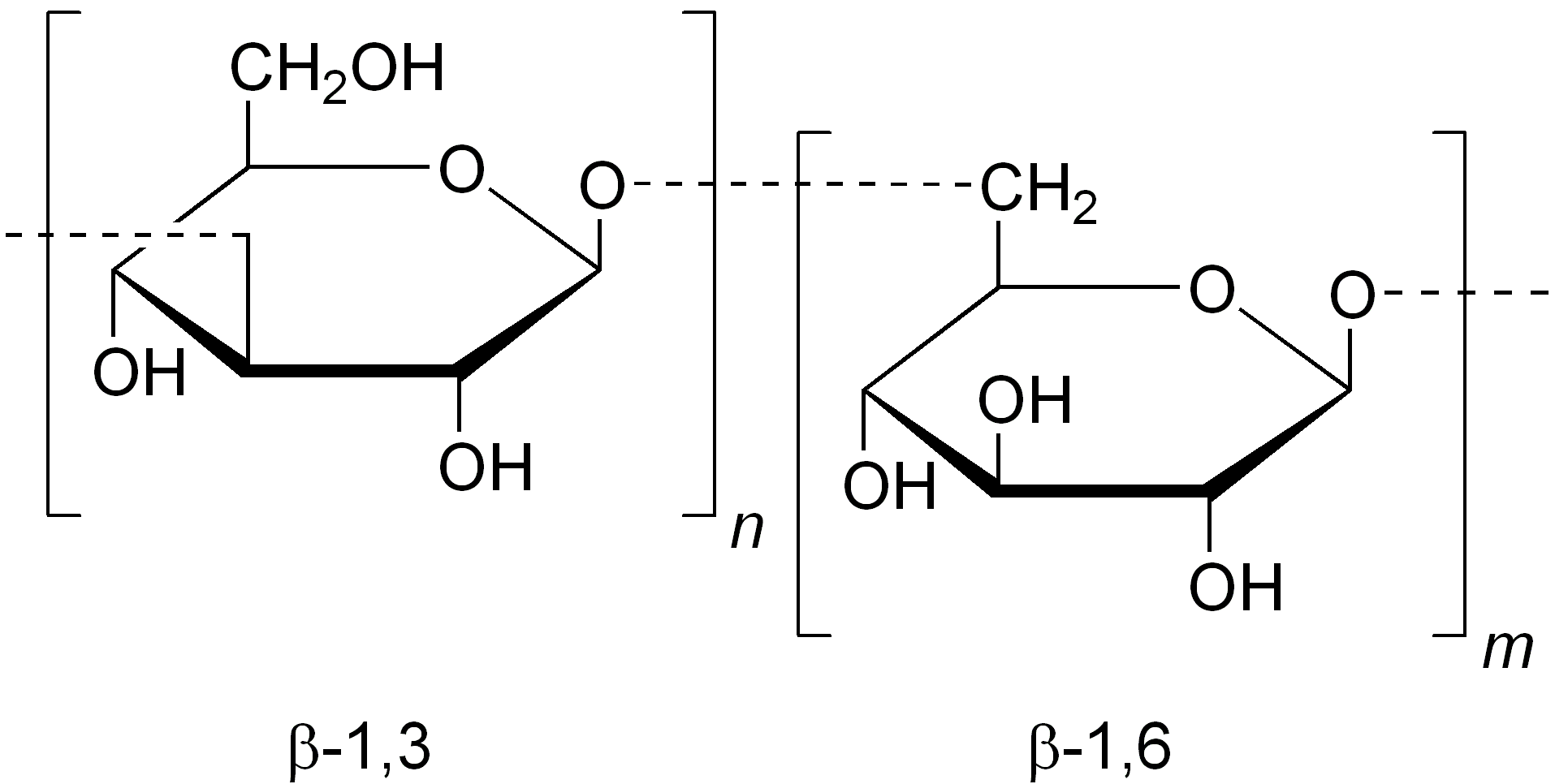

Names
- Other names Laminaran

Identifiers
CAS Number	9008-22-4
3D model (JSmol)	Interactive image
ChEBI	CHEBI:6364
ChemSpider	388438
ECHA InfoCard	100.029.726
EC Number	232-712-4
PubChem CID	439306
CompTox Dashboard (EPA)	DTXSID2093823
- InChI: InChI=1S/C18H32O16/c19-1-4-7(22)10(25)11(26)17(31-4)34-15-9(24)6(3-21)32-18(13(15)28)33-14-8(23)5(2-20)30-16(29)12(14)27/h4-29H,1-3H2/t4-,5-,6-,7-,8-,9-,10+,11-,12-,13-,14+,15+,16?,17?,18?/m1/s1 Key: DBTMGCOVALSLOR-VPNXCSTESA-N; InChI=1/C18H32O16/c19-1-4-7(22)10(25)11(26)17(31-4)34-15-9(24)6(3-21)32-18(13(15)28)33-14-8(23)5(2-20)30-16(29)12(14)27/h4-29H,1-3H2/t4-,5-,6-,7-,8-,9-,10+,11-,12-,13-,14+,15+,16?,17?,18?/m1/s1 Key: DBTMGCOVALSLOR-VPNXCSTEBM
- SMILES: O([C@H]1[C@H](O)[C@H](OC(O)[C@@H]1O)CO)C3O[C@@H]([C@@H](O)[C@H](OC2O[C@H](CO)[C@@H](O)[C@H](O)[C@H]2O)[C@H]3O)CO

Properties
Chemical formula	(C_{6}H_{10}O_{5})_{x}
Molar mass	Variable
- Except where otherwise noted, data are given for materials in their standard state (at 25 °C [77 °F], 100 kPa). verify (what is ?) Infobox references

The molecule laminarin (also known as laminaran) is a storage glucan (a polysaccharide of glucose) found in brown algae. It is used as a carbohydrate food reserve in the same way that chrysolaminarin is used by phytoplankton, especially in diatoms. It is created by photosynthesis and is made up of β(1→3)-glucan with β(1→6)-branches. It is a linear polysaccharide, with a β(1→3):β(1→6) ratio of 3:1. Its hydrolysis is catalyzed by enzymes such as laminarinase (EC 3.2.1.6) that breaks the β(1→3) bonds. It has been suggested that the annual production of algae laminarin amounts to 12 ± 8 gigatons, i.e., about three times the annual atmospheric CO_{2} increase by fossil fuel burning, that its concentration is driven by light variability and that it contributes substantially to the carbon export from surface waters, as it may account for up to half of organic carbon in sinking diatom-containing particles.
