= Tapetum (botany) =

Specialised layer of cells the anther of flowering plants

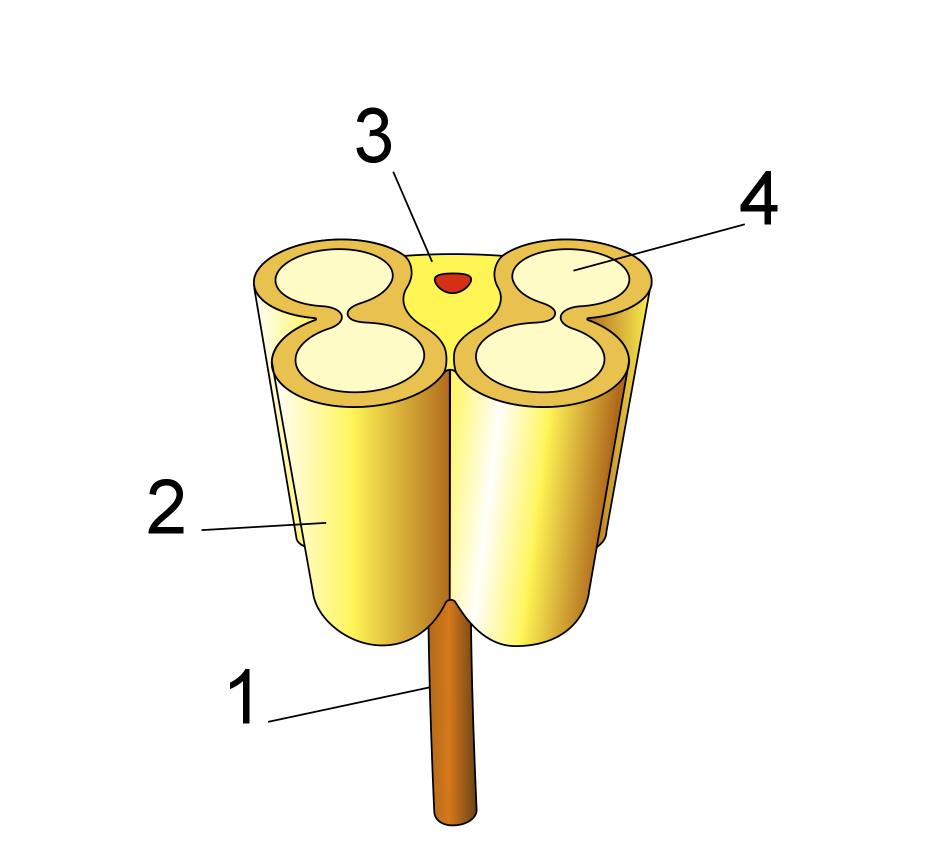
Schematic of anther (1: Filament 2: Theca 3: Connective 4: Pollen sac or Microsporangium)

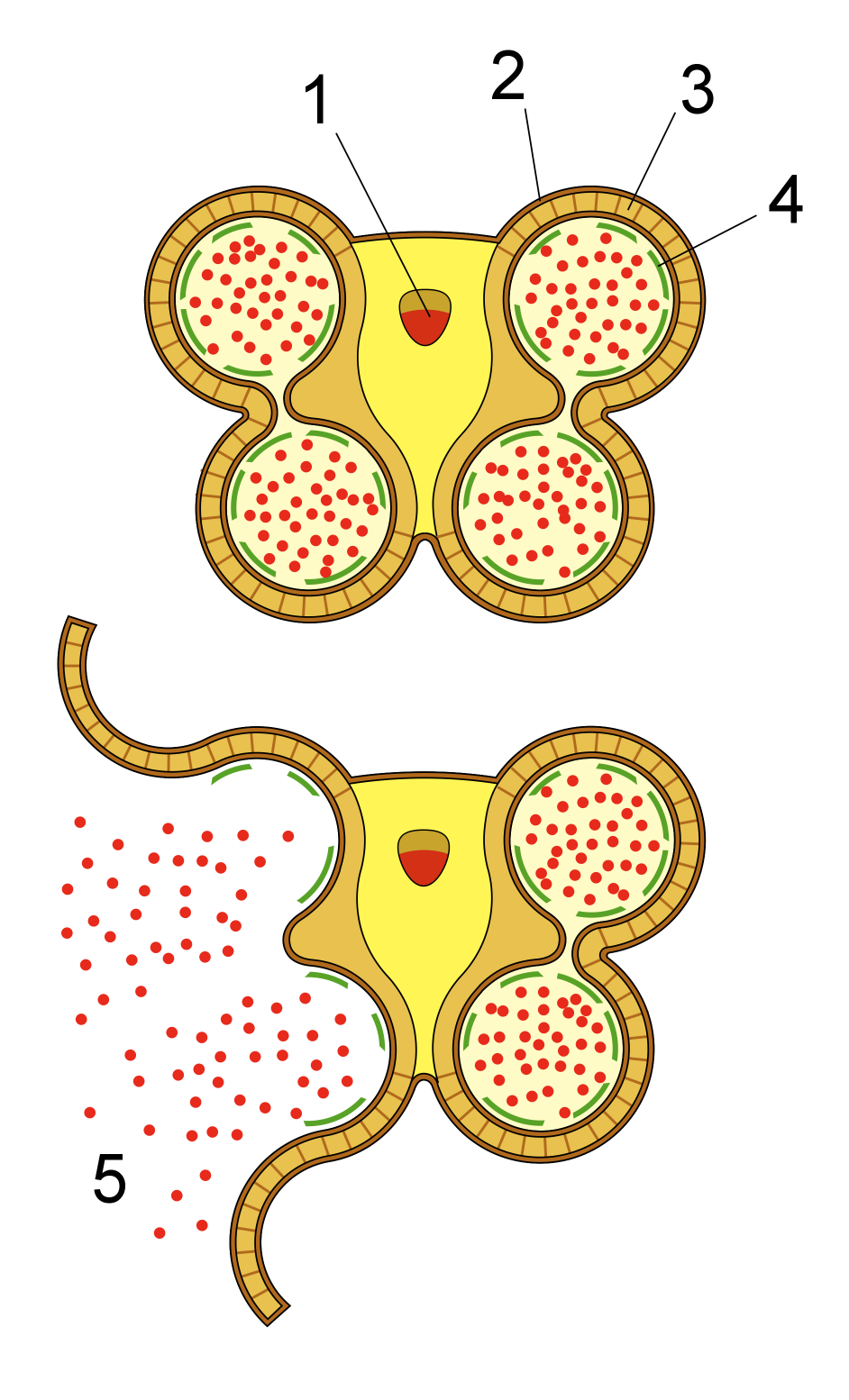
Section of anther, showing dehiscence and release of pollen (1: Vascular bundle 2: Epidermis 3: Fibrous layer 4: Tapetum 5: Pollen)

The tapetum is a specialised layer of nutritive cells found within the anther of flowering plants, located between the sporogenous tissue and the anther wall. The tapetum is important for the nutrition and development of pollen grains and a source of precursors for the pollen coat. The cells are usually bigger and normally have more than one nucleus per cell. As the sporogenous cells undergo mitosis, the nuclei of tapetal cells also divide. Sometimes, this mitosis is abnormal, which is why many cells of a mature tapetum become multinucleated. Polyploidy and polyteny can also be seen sometimes. The tapetum's unusually large nuclear constitution helps it provide nutrients and regulatory molecules to the forming pollen grains. The following processes are responsible for this:

- Endomitosis
- Normal mitosis not followed by cytokinesis
- Formation of restitution nuclei
- Endoreduplication

The tapetum aids in pollen wall formation, transportation of nutrients to the inner side of the anther, and synthesis of callase enzyme to separate microspore tetrads.

== Types of tapetum ==
Two main tapetum types are recognised: secretory (glandular) and periplasmodial (amoeboid). In the secretory type, a layer of tapetal cells remains around the anther locule. By contrast, the tapetal cell walls dissolve in the periplasmodial type, and their protoplasts fuse to form a multinucleate periplasmodium. A third, less common type, the invasive non-syncytial tapetum, has been described in Canna, where the tapetal cell walls break down to invade the anther locule but do not fuse to form a periplasmodium.

Amongst the monocots, Acorales, the first branching clade, has a secretory tapetum, while the other alismatid clade, Alismatales, is predominantly periplasmodial. Amongst the late branching clades, the lilioid monocots are nearly all secretory, while the commelinid monocots are diverse concerning the tapetal pattern.

== Bibliography ==
- Furness, Carol A.; Rudall, Paula J. (January 2001), "Pollen and anther characters in monocot systematics", Grana, 40 (1–2): 17–25, doi:10.1080/00173130152591840
