= Pleuran =

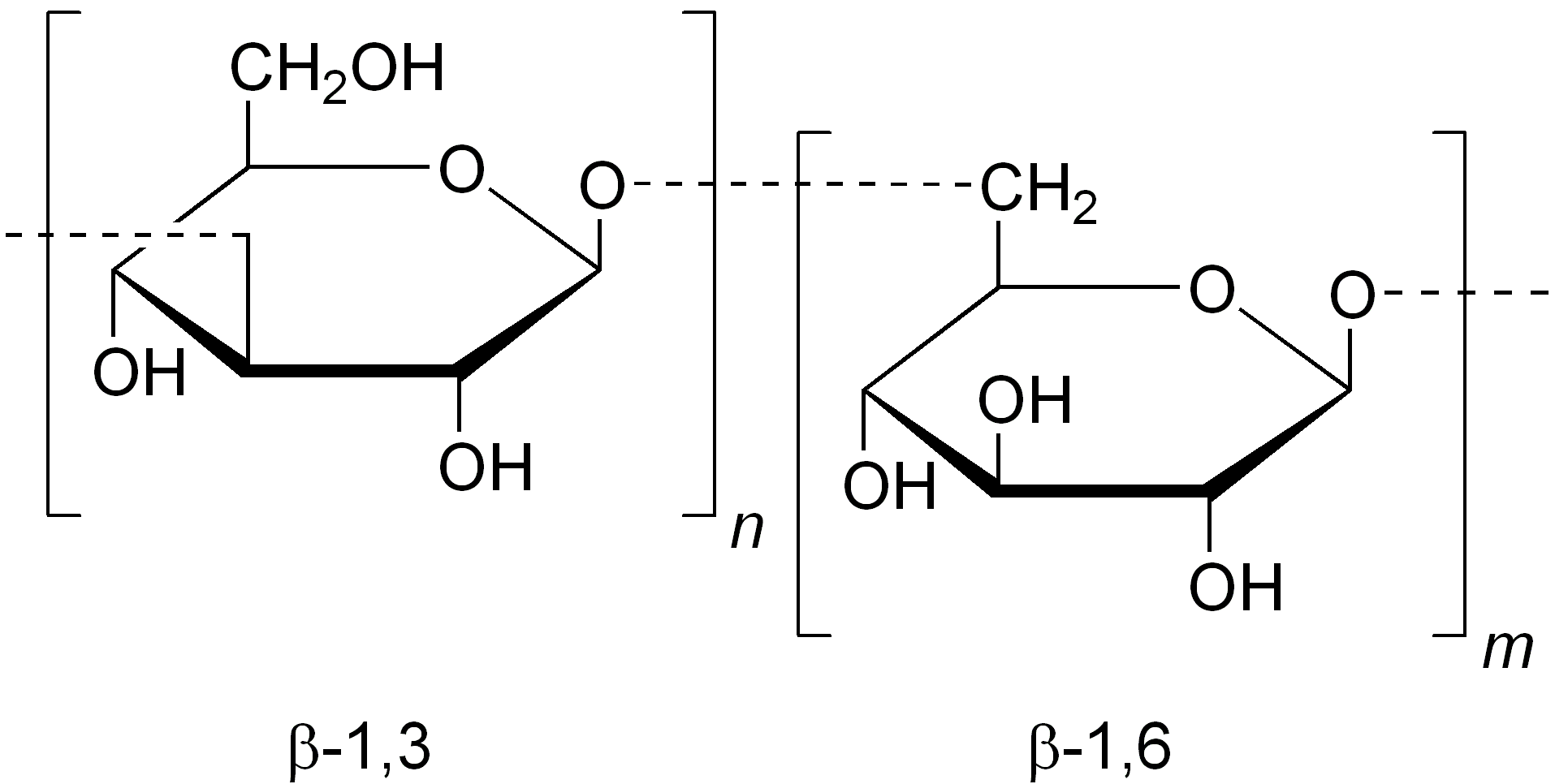

Identifiers
CAS Number	159940-37-1
ChemSpider	none

Properties
Chemical formula	(C_{6}H_{10}O_{5})_{x}
Molar mass	Variable
- Except where otherwise noted, data are given for materials in their standard state (at 25 °C [77 °F], 100 kPa). verify (what is ?) Infobox references

Pleuran is an insoluble polysaccharide (β-(1,3/1,6)-D-glucan), isolated from Pleurotus ostreatus.

Pleuran belongs to a group of glucose polymers commonly called beta-glucans demonstrating biological response modifier properties. These immunomodulating properties render the host more resistant to infections and neoplasms.

In a study published in December 2010, pleuran demonstrated to have a protective effect against exercise-induced suppression of immune cell activity (NK cells) in subjects taking 100 mg per day.

In another study published in 2011, pleuran reduced the incidence of upper respiratory tract infections and increased the number of circulating NK cells.

Pleuran is also being studied as a potential immunologic adjuvant.
