= L-Streptose =

l-Streptose

Names
- IUPAC name 5-Deoxy-3-C-formyl-α-l-lyxofuranose

Identifiers
CAS Number	13008-73-6
3D model (JSmol)	Interactive image
ChemSpider	16736038
PubChem CID	5460942 (open form)
UNII	1A913T4W5M
- InChI: InChI=1S/C6H10O5/c1-3-6(10,2-7)4(8)5(9)11-3/h2-5,8-10H,1H3/t3-,4-,5+,6+/m0/s1 Key: PSLNNVPHIJQGRF-UNTFVMJOSA-N
- SMILES: C[C@H]1[C@@]([C@H]([C@@H](O1)O)O)(C=O)O

Properties
Chemical formula	C_{6}H_{10}O_{5}
Molar mass	162.141 g·mol^{−1}
- Except where otherwise noted, data are given for materials in their standard state (at 25 °C [77 °F], 100 kPa). Infobox references

l-Streptose is a branched monosaccharide similar to apiose in structure. l-Streptose is one of the sugars in streptomycin, an aminoglycoside antibiotic that has toxic effects in the kidney and other side effects.

l-Streptose has been prepared from a carbohydrate derivative. The protected monosaccharide was reacted with an organolithium sulfur compound and then catalytically hydrolyzed to produce l-streptose.
