= Chrysolaminarin =

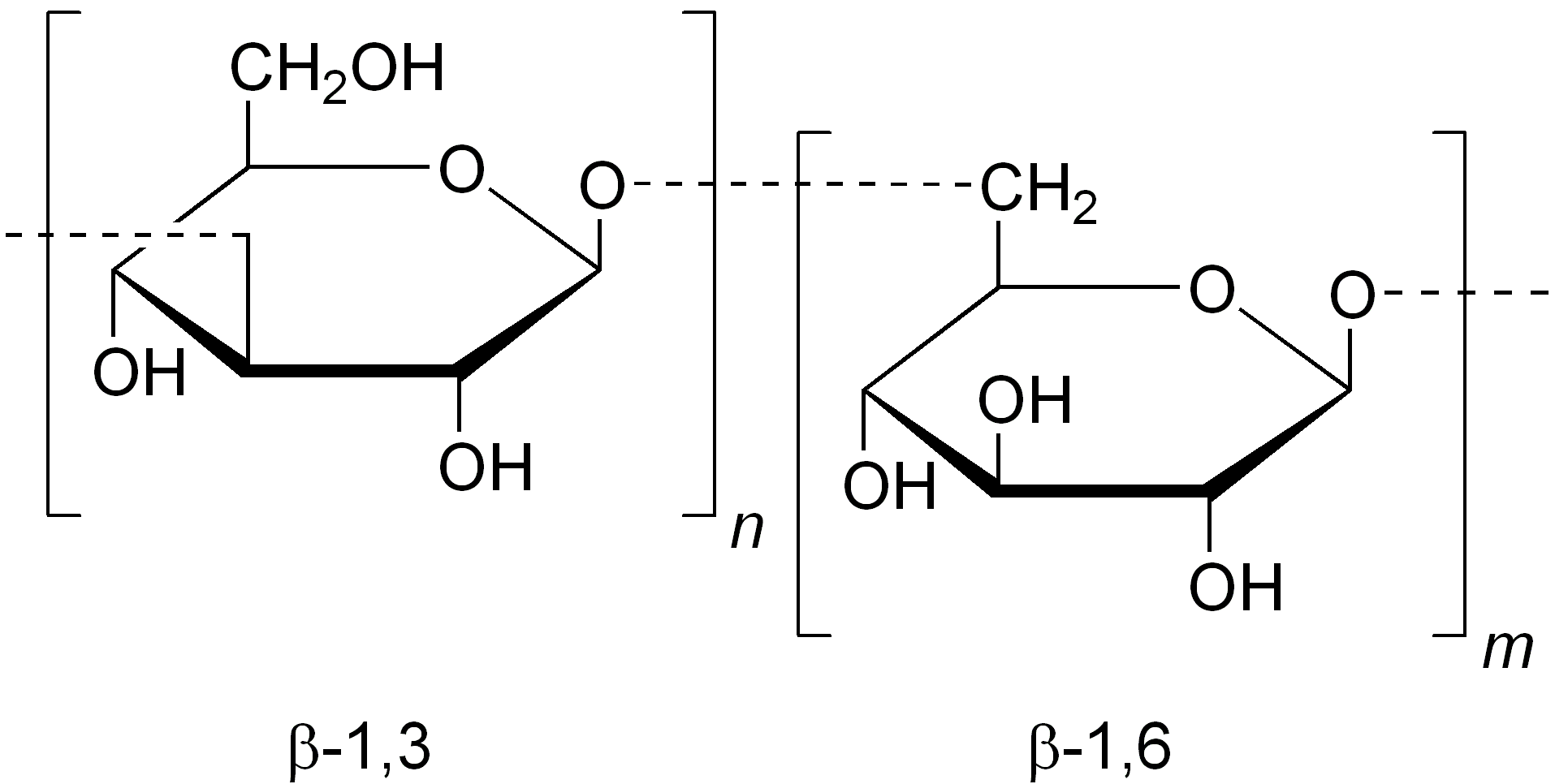

Names
- Other names Chrysolaminaran; Leucosin

Identifiers
CAS Number	9013-94-9
ChemSpider	none

Properties
Chemical formula	variable
Molar mass	variable
Melting point	273 °C (523 °F; 546 K)
Solubility in water	Soluble
- Except where otherwise noted, data are given for materials in their standard state (at 25 °C [77 °F], 100 kPa). verify (what is ?) Infobox references

Chrysolaminarin is a linear polymer of β(1→3) and β(1→6) linked glucose units in a ratio of 11:1. It used to be known as leucosin.

== Function ==
Chrysolaminarin is a storage polysaccharide typically found in photosynthetic heterokonts. It is used as a carbohydrate food reserve by phytoplankton such as Bacillariophyta (similar to the use of laminarin by brown algae).

Chrysolaminarin is stored inside the cells of these organisms dissolved in water and encapsuled in vacuoles whose refractive index increases with chrysolaminarin content. In addition, heterokont algae use oil as a storage compound. Besides energy reserve, oil helps the algae to control their buoyancy.

Chrysolaminarin is also the major storage polysaccharide of most haptophyte algae.
