= Endo-1,3(4)-β-glucanase =

Enzyme

Identifiers
- EC no.: 3.2.1.6
- CAS no.: 62213-14-3

Databases
- IntEnz: IntEnz view
- BRENDA: BRENDA entry
- ExPASy: NiceZyme view
- KEGG: KEGG entry
- MetaCyc: metabolic pathway
- PRIAM: profile
- PDB structures: RCSB PDB PDBe PDBsum
Search
- PMC: articles
- PubMed: articles
- NCBI: proteins

Endo-1,3(4)-β-glucanase (EC 3.2.1.6, endo-1,3-β-D-glucanase, laminarinase, β-1,3-glucanase,4-glucanase, endo-β-(1→3)-D-glucanase, endo-1,3-1,4-β-D-glucanase, endo-β-(1-3)-D-glucanase, endo-β-1,3-glucanase IV, 1,3-1,4)-β-D-glucan 3(4)-glucanohydrolase) is an enzyme with systematic name 3(or 4)-β-D-glucan 3(4)-glucanohydrolase. It catalyses the following chemical reaction

Endohydrolysis of (1→3)- or (1→4)-linkages in β-D-glucans when the glucose residue whose reducing group is involved in the linkage to be hydrolysed is itself substituted at C-3

Substrates include laminarin, lichenin and cereal D-glucans.
