= Levoglucosan =

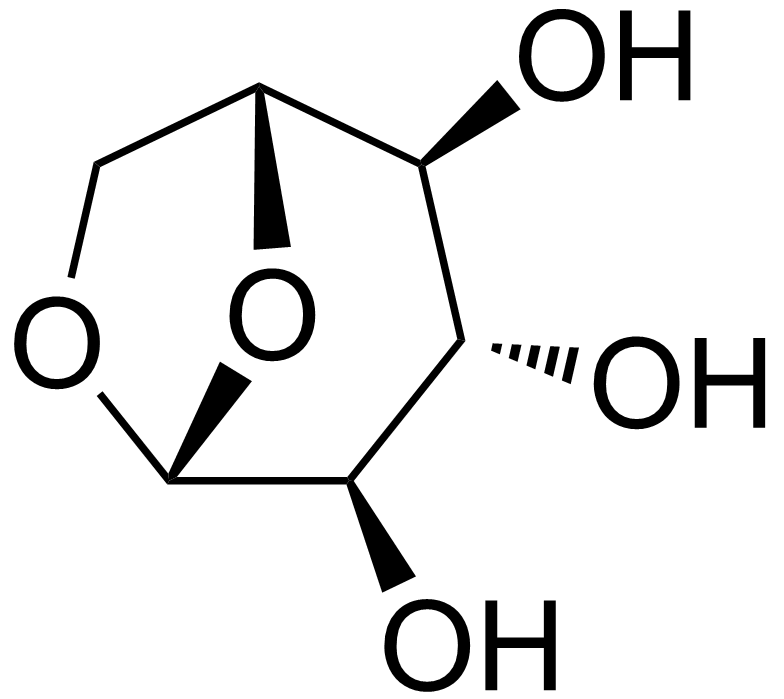
- Stereo skeletal formula of levoglucosan

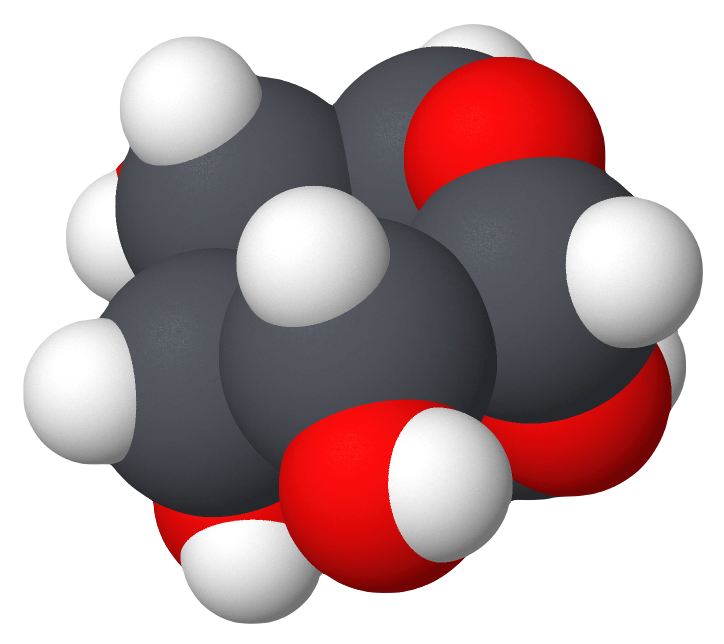

Names
- IUPAC name 1,6-Anhydro-β-D-glucopyranose
- Systematic IUPAC name (1R,2S,3S,4R,5R)-6,8-Dioxabicyclo[3.2.1]octane-2,3,4-triol
- Other names Levoglucosan; Leucoglucosan

Identifiers
CAS Number	498-07-7
3D model (JSmol)	Interactive image
Beilstein Reference	80998
ChEBI	CHEBI:30997
ChemSpider	9587432
ECHA InfoCard	100.007.142
EC Number	207-855-0
MeSH	1,6-Anhydro-beta-glucopyranose
PubChem CID	2724705
UNII	5132N17FSD
CompTox Dashboard (EPA)	DTXSID90904321
- InChI: InChI=1S/C6H10O5/c7-3-2-1-10-6(11-2)5(9)4(3)8/h2-9H,1H2 Key: TWNIBLMWSKIRAT-UHFFFAOYSA-N
- SMILES: OC1C2COC(O2)C(O)C1O

Properties
Chemical formula	C_{6}H_{10}O_{5}
Molar mass	162.141 g·mol^{−1}
Appearance	Colorless crystals
Density	1.688 g·cm^{−3} (predicted)
Melting point	182 to 184 °C (360 to 363 °F; 455 to 457 K)
Boiling point	384 °C (723 °F; 657 K) predicted
log P	−0.04 (predicted)
Vapor pressure	24.1 μPa (predicted)

Hazards
Flash point	185.9 °C (366.6 °F; 459.0 K) (predicted)
- Except where otherwise noted, data are given for materials in their standard state (at 25 °C [77 °F], 100 kPa). Infobox references

Levoglucosan (C_{6}H_{10}O_{5}) is an organic compound with a six-carbon ring structure formed from the pyrolysis of carbohydrates, such as starch and cellulose. As a result, levoglucosan is often used as a chemical tracer for biomass burning in atmospheric chemistry studies, particularly with respect to airborne particulate matter. Along with other tracers such as potassium, oxalate, and gaseous acetonitrile, levoglucosan has been shown to be highly correlated with regional fires. This is because the gas emitted by the pyrolysis of wood (biomass) contains significant amounts of levoglucosan.

Levoglucosan has been described as "an unequivocal biomass burning tracer" in the context of forest and brush fires. But the anhydrosugar has only been found detectable in low temperature samples (150-350 °C), meaning that its value as an indicator for smoke from controlled biomass combustion in, for instance, modern domestic wood stoves which operate at temperatures above 500 °C, is "very doubtful". Levoglucosan is a marker for coal combustion as well as wood.

The hydrolysis of levoglucosan generates the fermentable sugar glucose. Levoglucosan can be utilized in the synthesis of chiral polymers such as unhydrolysable glucose polymers.
