= CheckUser =

MediaWiki function for investigating user IP addresses

CheckUser is a MediaWiki extension that can be used to reveal the IP addresses of an account to enforce blocks. Together with manual inspection, it assists in uncovering illegitimate behavior such as spam. This protects the wiki from disruption by any particular group or individual. It can also show all edits from an IP including those by registered users. People with CheckUser access are referred to as checkusers.

== Purpose ==
Checkusers target abusive users, which are blocked or banned to protect the wiki from harm. Although they are held to a higher professional standard, checkusers do not have greater control of articles. However, the role has been categorized, alongside the "Oversight" role, as the second-highest level in Wikipedia's power hierarchy, below founder.

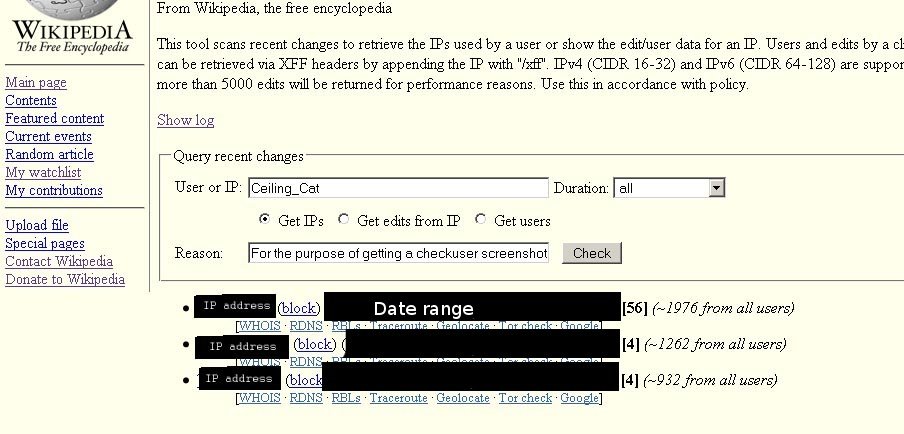
User interface in 2008

When users attempt to continue spamming unblocked by creating multiple accounts, checkusers can determine if the accounts all have the same IP range. The blocking of open proxies forces threat actors to resort to botnets.

Edits attributed to an IP address are not fully anonymous and can be traced back as they were in the United States congressional staff edits to Wikipedia scandal. Keeping access to registered accounts' IP addresses limited to checkusers helps protect the privacy of users.

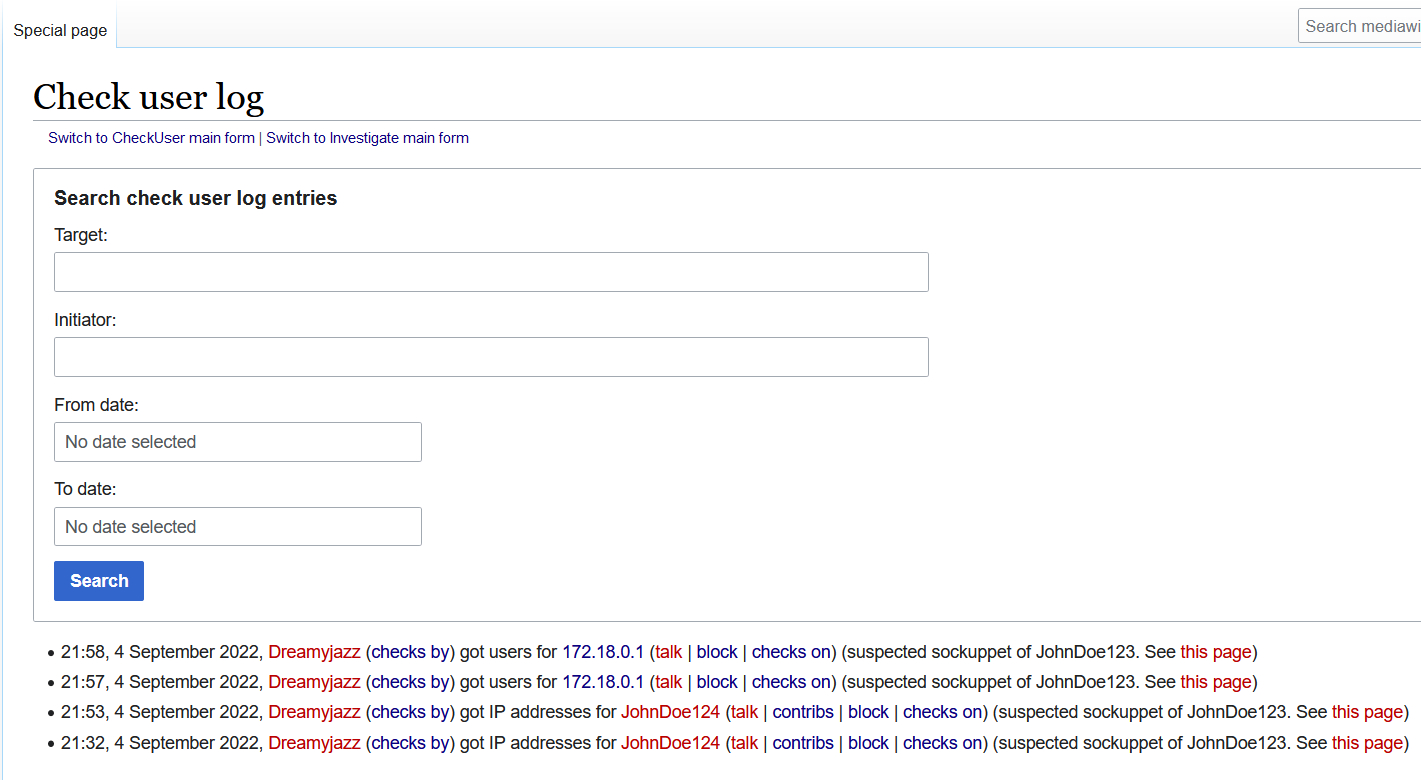
Audit log

Transparency is promoted by keeping logs of CheckUser usage. The Ombuds commission was established to supplement self-regulation with audits and maintain the privacy policy.

== Incidents ==
A cabal of Croatian Wikipedia administrators conspired to coordinate the abuse they were normally elected to defend against. One co-conspirator CheckUser was installed to "eventually fabricate checkuser data to try and secure [Admin 2's] innocence." By controlling this position, the cabal had free rein to successfully violate Wikipedia policies while editing articles.

Checkusers helped uncover at least 381 editors writing promotional material and running the Orangemoody extortion scam. The cleanup of articles was deferred to other editors.

British conservative politicians denied allegations that an account belonged to their chairman. In the end, the disclosure of personal information was found to be unjustified and tenuous for the case. The accuser's CheckUser permissions were removed to prevent biased exertion of "political or social control".

A user named Essjay falsely claimed to have multiple university degrees; he attained a position of community trust and became a CheckUser. This was a Wikipedia problem because according to Dariusz Jemielniak at Kozminski University, IP addresses are considered sensitive information. The general concern with this position is that it can be inappropriately used to unmask what should remain anonymous accounts.
