= Cellulase unit =

Unit of measurement for enzyme cellulase

A cellulase unit (CU) is a unit of measurement for the enzyme cellulase. One cellulase unit is that activity that will produce a relative fluidity change of one in 5 minutes in a defined carboxymethylcellulose substrate under the conditions of an assay (50 deg Celsius, pH 4.5). Cellulases enzymatically split cellulose into a variety of hexoses, this is called hydrolysis.
