= Endo-1,3-beta-glucanase =

Endo-1,3-beta-glucanase may refer to:

- Endo-1,3(4)-b-glucanase, an enzyme
- Glucan endo-1,3-b-D-glucosidase, an enzyme
