= Glycoside hydrolase family 5 =

Family of enzymes that hydrolyse glycosidic bonds

Cellulase (glycosyl hydrolase family 5)

Identifiers
- Symbol: Cellulase
- Pfam: PF00150
- Pfam clan: CL0058
- InterPro: IPR001547
- PROSITE: PDOC00565
- SCOP2: 2exo / SCOPe / SUPFAM
- OPM superfamily: 117
- OPM protein: 2osx
- CAZy: GH5
- Membranome: 1365
Available protein structures:
- PDB: IPR001547 PF00150 (ECOD; PDBsum)
- AlphaFold: IPR001547; PF00150

In molecular biology, glycoside hydrolase family 5 is a family of glycoside hydrolases EC 3.2.1., which are a widespread group of enzymes that hydrolyse the glycosidic bond between two or more carbohydrates, or between a carbohydrate and a non-carbohydrate moiety. A classification system for glycoside hydrolases, based on sequence similarity, has led to the definition of >100 different families. This classification is available on the CAZy web site, and also discussed at CAZypedia, an online encyclopedia of carbohydrate active enzymes.

Glycoside hydrolase family 5 CAZY GH_5 comprises enzymes with several known activities including endoglucanase (EC 3.2.1.4); beta-mannanase (EC 3.2.1.78); exo-1,3-glucanase (EC 3.2.1.58); endo-1,6-glucanase (EC 3.2.1.75); xylanase (EC 3.2.1.8); endoglycoceramidase (EC 3.2.1.123); xanthanase.

The microbial degradation of cellulose and xylans requires several types of enzymes. Fungi and bacteria produces a spectrum of cellulolytic enzymes (cellulases) and xylanases which, on the basis of sequence similarities, can be classified into families. One of these families is known as the cellulase family A or as the glycosyl hydrolases family 5. One of the conserved regions in this family contains a conserved glutamic acid residue which is potentially involved in the catalytic mechanism.

In a recent study using Molecular Dynamics simulations, a considerable correlation between thermal stability and structural rigidity of members of family 5 with solved structures has been proved.
