= Cellobiose dehydrogenase (acceptor) =

cellobiose dehydrogenase (acceptor)

Identifiers
- EC no.: 1.1.99.18
- CAS no.: 54576-85-1

Databases
- BRENDA: enzyme data
- ExPASy: NiceZyme view
- KEGG: enzyme entry
- MetaCyc: metabolic pathway
- Rhea: reactions
- PDB structures: RCSB PDB PDBe PDBsum
- Gene Ontology: AmiGO / QuickGO
Search
- PMC: articles
- PubMed: articles
- NCBI: proteins

In enzymology, cellobiose dehydrogenase (acceptor) (EC 1.1.99.18) is an enzyme that catalyzes the chemical reaction

cellobiose
+ electron
acceptor
cellobiono-1,5-lactone
+ reduced
acceptor

The two substrates of this enzyme are cellobiose and an electron acceptor. Its products are cellobiono-1,5-lactone and the corresponding reduced acceptor.

This enzyme belongs to the family of oxidoreductases, to be specific those acting on the CH-OH group of donor with other acceptors. The systematic name of this enzyme class is cellobiose:acceptor 1-oxidoreductase. Other names in common use include cellobiose dehydrogenase, cellobiose oxidoreductase, Phanerochaete chrysosporium cellobiose oxidoreductase, CBOR, cellobiose oxidase, cellobiose:oxygen 1-oxidoreductase, CDH, and cellobiose:(acceptor) 1-oxidoreductase. It employs sometimes one cofactor, FAD, but in most cases both a heme and a FAD located in separate domains. It makes the enzyme to one of the more complex extracellular oxidoreductases. It is produced by wood degrading organisms.

== Structural studies ==
To date, structures of the separated dehydrogenase (DH) and cytochrome (CYT) domains were reported (PDB accession codes PDB: 1NAA and PDB: 1PL3). In 2015, full-length structures of the enzyme were resolved for CDH from Crassicarpon hotsonii syn. Myriococcum thermophilum (ChCDH, PDB accession code 4QI6) and CDH from Neurospora crassa (NcCDH, PDB accession code 4QI7).

The mobility of the CYT domain prevented for a long time the crystallization and X-ray structure elucidation of CDH. However, the crystal structures of the individual CYT and DH domains already showed structural complementarity and the position of the domain interface and provided a structural basis for the interdomain electron transfer observed in biochemical and bioelectrochemical studies.

The crystal structure of the Phanerochaete chrysosporium DH domain was described by Hallberg et al. as peanut-shaped with dimensions of ~72 x 57 x 45 Å. The observed GMC-oxidoreductase protein fold features an FAD-binding and a substrate-binding subdomain. The FAD-binding subdomain primarily consists of the Rossmann fold, which is typical for NAD(P)- and FAD-dependent enzymes whereas the substrate-binding subdomain consists of a central twisted, seven-stranded β-sheet with three α-helices on one side of the sheet and the active-site on the other side. The substrate-binding subdomain hosts the active-site that consists of a substrate binding-site (B-site) and the catalytic-site (C-site). The B-site holds the non-reducing end of cellobiose in position whereas at the C-site oxidizes the reducing end of cellobiose.

The CYT domain consist of an ellipsoidal antiparallel β-sandwich with dimensions of 30 x 36 x 47 Å and a topology resembling the variable heavy chain of the antibody Fab fragment with a five-stranded inner β-sheet and a six-stranded outer β-sheet . This protein fold was a new fold observed for a cytochrome. Both individual crystal structures provided mechanistic insights. The DH domain was soaked with the inhibitor cellobionolactam which resolved the binding position of the substrate and gave a mechanistic explanation for the reductive half-reaction [52]. The CYT domain structure revealed an unusual axial haem b iron coordination by a His and a Met residue, which is the basis for intramolecular electron transfer between the two domains. A mutational study on the iron-coordinating haem ligands performed by Rotseart et al. showed that either the replacement of Met by His, or the switching of both ligands resulted in an IET inactive CYT domain.

In 2015, the elucidation of the full-length structures of CDH from Crassicarpon hotsonii (syn. Myriococcum thermophilum) (PDB ID: 4QI6) and Neurospora crassa (PDB ID: 4QI7) increased the understanding of the domain mobility for the role of CYT as built-in redox mediator. Tan and Kracher et al. showed that CDH exists in a closed-state and an open-state conformation. In the closed-state the haem b accepts an electron from the FAD after substrate oxidation and it donates the electron to an external electron acceptor in the open-state. It was found that IET does not depend on the prominent Trp residue positioned directly between the FAD and the haem cofactor, but on a surface exposed Arg in the substrate channel, which stabilises the interaction with CYT through a haem propionate group. The heme b propionate-D is folded away, and a hydrogen bond to Tyr99 in the CYT domain prevents it from interacting directly with the DH active site. The closest edge-to-edge distance between heme b and FAD is 9 Å, which is well within the 14-Å limit for efficient electron transfer. The mobile CYT domain of CDH is a unique feature among GMC-oxidoreductases and acquired at a later stage of evolution. The CYT domain mobility is regulated by a flexible peptide linker of varying length and composition (e.g., N. crassa CDH IIA = 17 amino acids, N. crassa CDH IIB = 33 amino acids), which connects both domains. The movement of CYT has been observed by AFM and SAXS studies.

== Phylogenetic classification ==
The CDH sequences evolved into four phylogenetic branches: Class I CDH sequences are found exclusively in Basidiomycota whereas CDH sequences from Class II, Class III, and Class IV are found only in Ascomycota. Class I CDHs have a strong affinity for cellulose and bind presumably via a cellulose binding-site on the surface of the DH domain that is different from the active-site. This cellulose binding-site is not present in other CDH classes. The binding to cellulose in Class II CDHs depends on the presence of a C-terminal family 1 carbohydrate binding module (CBM1). Some Class II CDH feature a C-terminal CBM1 and are classified as Class IIA CDHs, whereas Class IIB CDHs have no CBM1 and do not bind to cellulose. Other differences between Class I and Class II CDHs are in their substrate specificity and the pH optimum of the IET. Little can be said about Class III and Class IV CDHs, which have not yet been expressed and characterised. From sequence alignments a different active-site geometry can be deduced, but the substrate is unknown. Class IV CDHs are evolutionary furthest related to the other CDH classes and do not feature an electron transferring CYT domain, which suggests a different physiological role and the loss of its ability for DET.

== Catalysis ==
CDH catalyses the 2e-/2H+ oxidation of the anomeric carbon atom (C1) of the disaccharide cellobiose to the cellobiono-δ-lactone hydrolyses further to cellobionic acid in water. Besides the natural substrate cellobiose and the cellodextrins cellotriose, cellotetraose, cellopentaose, and cellohexaose also the cellulose building unit glucose, as well as the hemicellulose building monomers or breakdown products galactose, mannose, mannobiose, mannopentaose, xylose, xylobiose and xylotriose, or starch derived maltose, maltotriose and maltotetraose have been reported as substrates of greatly varying catalytic efficiency for CDH. A very good substrate not related to plant polysaccharides is lactose, because of its structural similarity to cellobiose. Cellobiose, cello-oligosaccharides, and lactose are the substrates for which CDH exhibits the highest catalytic efficiency, whereas monosaccharides are bad substrates with a very low affinity (high K_{M}) to only the catalytic C-site of CDH. The extreme discrepancy of the catalytic efficiencies of P. chrysosporium CDH for cellobiose over glucose (87500 : 1) is being connected to the physiological role of the white-rot basidiomycete enzyme. In ascomycete CDHs the discrimination of glucose is less strict and a wider spectrum of mono- and oligosaccharides are converted. Of course, the affinity of CDH to di- and oligosaccharide substrates is much higher than for monosaccharides. However, Class II CDHs have K_{M}-values for glucose of 10–100 mM, which is in the range of FAD-dependent glucose oxidase, also a GMC-oxidoreductase (5–100 mM). The lower catalytic rate of Class I and Class II CDHs (below 50 s^{−1}) compared to glucose oxidase (300–2000 s^{−1}) is probably an evolutionary adaption to the acquired CYT domain to optimize IET and prevent futile reactions of the substrate in an idle active-site.

== CDH as a bioelectrocatalyst ==
CDH exhibits various properties that makes it a suitable electrocatalyst for biosensors or biofuel cells. Unlike any other carbohydrate converting GMC-oxidoreductase it can be contacted via mediated electron transfer (MET) or direct electron transfer (DET). CDH-based 2nd and 3rd generation biosensors for the quantitation of commercially or medically relevant molecules such as glucose or lactose have been developed. The advantage 2nd generation biosensors is their high sensitivity, the advantage of 3rd generation biosensors is the avoidance of redox mediators in implantable blood glucose monitoring systems. CDH-based 3rd generation biosensors have a robust performance because of the good thermal and turnover stability of CDH and the mobile CYT domain, which can interact with many electrode materials and surface modifications and deliver reasonably high current densities.

== CDH-based biosensors ==
CDH has been used as biosensor element for the detection of a number of different analytes ever since 1992, when Elmgren et al. reported on a new biosensor sensitive towards cello-oligosaccharides with degrees of polymerization of 2 to 6, lactose and maltose. Research on CDH employed as biosensor since then until 2013 has been reviewed, providing lists of CDH-based biosensors in both DET and MET mode for phenols (catechol, dopamine, noradrenaline, hydroquinone, aminophenol) and carbohydrates (cellobiose, lactose, maltose, glucose).

Both Class I and Class II CDHs have been employed as biocatalysts for biosensors. In accordance with their preferred substrates, Class I CDHs were mainly applied for the detection and quantitation of phenols, cellobiose, and lactose, whereas Class II CDHs have been applied for the detection of cellobiose, lactose, maltose and glucose. Among Class I CDHs, Phanerochaete chrysosporium CDH is the most comprehensively studied enzyme was employed for the detection of various phenol derivates, cellobiose and lactose. Phanerochaete sordida and Trametes villosa CDH have been used for the detection of lactose and Sclerotium rolfsii CDH for the detection of dopamine.

Among Class II CDHs, Crassicarpon hotsonii and Crassicarpon thermophilum CDH were employed as recognition element for cellobiose, lactose, glucose and maltose and Humicola insolens CDH for glucose and maltose. Detection of maltose was in all cases only reported to show that maltose is not interfering with glucose detection, which is important for blood glucose testing.

In 2017, DirectSens GmbH launched the first lactose biosensor based on a CDH for very low lactose concentrations in lactose reduced milk products. LactoSens is the only third-generation biosensor on the market and distributed globally to dairy companies.
