= Cellulase =

Enzymes that catalyze cellulolysis

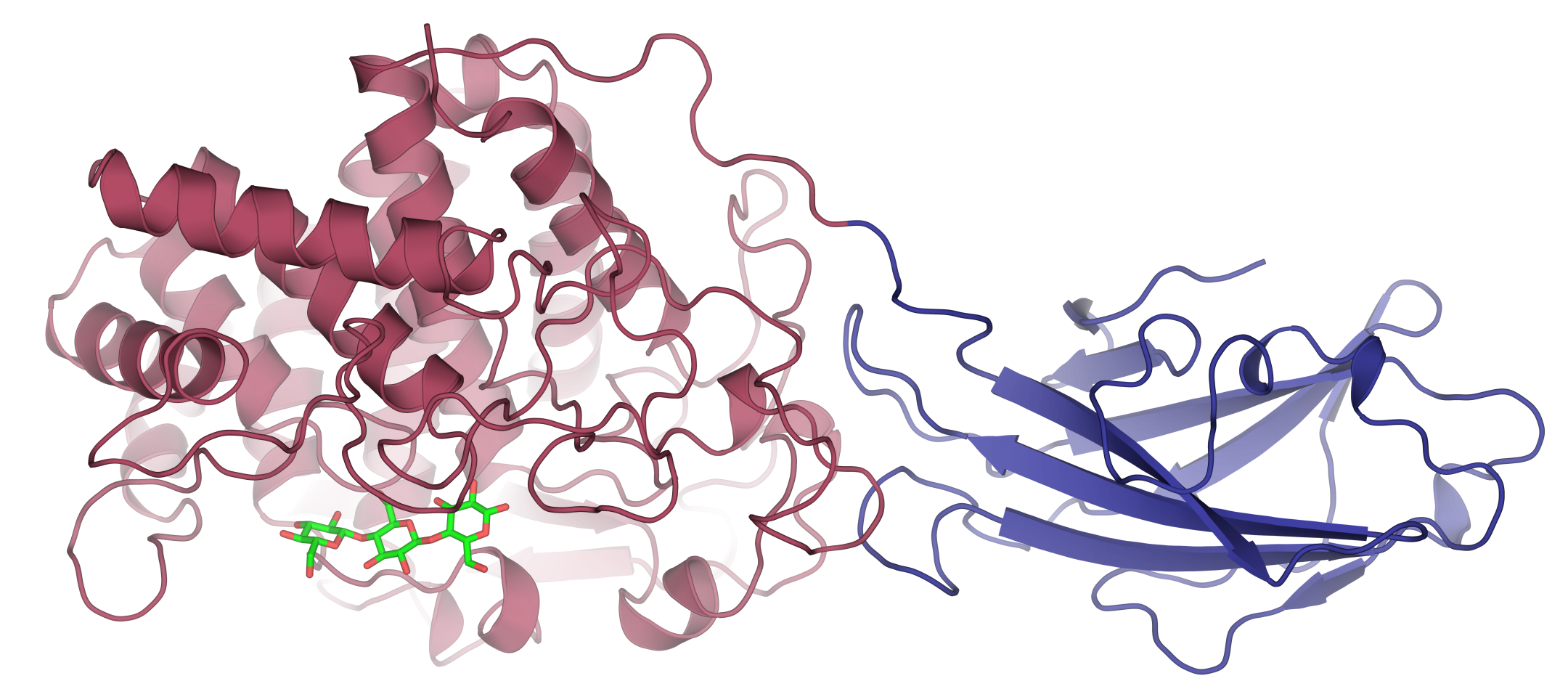
- A cellulase enzyme produced by Thermomonospora fusca, with cellotriose bound in the shallow groove of the catalytic domain

Identifiers
- EC no.: 3.2.1.4
- CAS no.: 9012-54-8

Databases
- BRENDA: enzyme data
- ExPASy: NiceZyme view
- KEGG: enzyme entry
- MetaCyc: metabolic pathway
- Rhea: reactions
- PDB structures: RCSB PDB PDBe PDBsum
- Gene Ontology: AmiGO / QuickGO
Search
- PMC: articles
- PubMed: articles
- NCBI: proteins

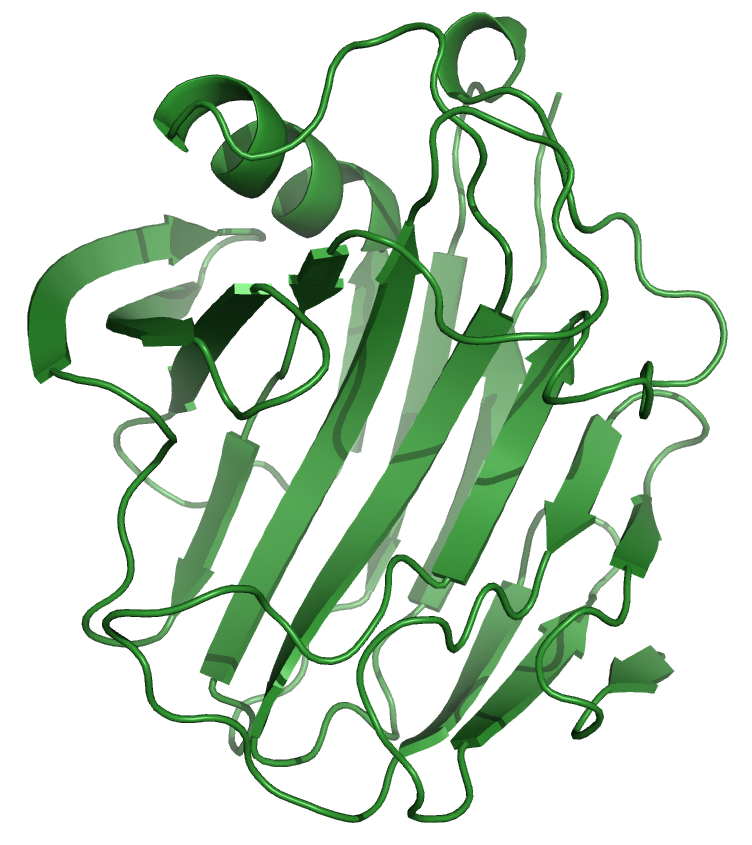
Ribbon representation of the Streptomyces lividans β-1,4-endoglucanase catalytic domain - an example from the family 12 glycoside hydrolases

Cellulase (EC 3.2.1.4; systematic name 4-β-D-glucan 4-glucanohydrolase) is any of several enzymes produced chiefly by fungi, bacteria, and protozoans that catalyze cellulolysis, the decomposition of cellulose and of some related polysaccharides:

Endohydrolysis of (1→4)-β-D-glucosidic linkages in cellulose, lichenin and cereal β-D-glucan

The name is also used for any naturally occurring mixture or complex of various such enzymes, that act serially or synergistically to decompose cellulosic material.

Cellulases break down the cellulose molecule into monosaccharides ("simple sugars") such as β-glucose, or shorter polysaccharides and oligosaccharides. Cellulose breakdown is of considerable economic importance, because it makes a major constituent of plants available for consumption and use in chemical reactions. The specific reaction involved is the hydrolysis of the 1,4-β-D-glycosidic linkages in cellulose, hemicellulose, lichenin, and cereal β-D-glucans. Because cellulose molecules bind strongly to each other, cellulolysis is relatively difficult compared to the breakdown of other polysaccharides such as starch.

Most mammals have only very limited ability to digest dietary fibres like cellulose by themselves. In many herbivorous animals such as ruminants like cattle and sheep and hindgut fermenters like horses, cellulases are produced by symbiotic bacteria. Endogenous cellulases are produced by a few types of animals, such as some termites, snails, and earthworms.

Cellulases have also been found in green microalgae (Chlamydomonas reinhardtii, Gonium pectorale and Volvox carteri) and their catalytic domains (CD) belonging to GH9 Family show highest sequence homology to metazoan endogenous cellulases. Algal cellulases are modular, consisting of putative novel cysteine-rich carbohydrate-binding modules (CBMs), proline/serine-(PS) rich linkers in addition to putative Ig-like and unknown domains in some members. Cellulase from Gonium pectorale consisted of two CDs separated by linkers and with a C-terminal CBM.

Several different kinds of cellulases are known, which differ structurally and mechanistically. Synonyms, derivatives, and specific enzymes associated with the name "cellulase" include endo-1,4-β-D-glucanase (β-1,4-glucanase, β-1,4-endoglucan hydrolase, endoglucanase D, 1,4-(1,3;1,4)-β-D-glucan 4-glucanohydrolase), carboxymethyl cellulase (CMCase), avicelase, celludextrinase, cellulase A, cellulosin AP, alkali cellulase, cellulase A 3, 9.5 cellulase, celloxylanase and pancellase SS. Enzymes that cleave lignin have occasionally been called cellulases, but this old usage is deprecated; they are lignin-modifying enzymes.

== Types and action ==
Five general types of cellulases based on the type of reaction catalyzed:

- Endocellulases (EC 3.2.1.4) randomly cleave internal bonds at amorphous sites that create new chain ends.
- Exocellulases or cellobiohydrolases (EC 3.2.1.91) cleave two to four units from the ends of the exposed chains produced by endocellulase, resulting in tetrasaccharides or disaccharides, such as cellobiose. Exocellulases are further classified into type I, that work processively from the reducing end of the cellulose chain, and type II, that work processively from the nonreducing end.
- Cellobiases (EC 3.2.1.21) or β-glucosidases hydrolyse the exocellulase product into individual monosaccharides.
- Oxidative cellulases depolymerize cellulose by radical reactions, as for instance cellobiose dehydrogenase (acceptor).
- Cellulose phosphorylases depolymerize cellulose using phosphates instead of water.

Within the above types there are also progressive (also known as processive) and nonprogressive types. Progressive cellulase will continue to interact with a single polysaccharide strand, nonprogressive cellulase will interact once then disengage and engage another polysaccharide strand.

Cellulase action is considered to be synergistic as all three classes of cellulase can yield much more sugar than the addition of all three separately. Aside from ruminants, most animals (including humans) do not produce cellulase in their bodies and can only partially break down cellulose through fermentation, limiting their ability to use energy in fibrous plant material.

== Structure ==
Most fungal cellulases have a two-domain structure, with one catalytic domain and one cellulose binding domain, that are connected by a flexible linker. This structure is adapted for working on an insoluble substrate, and it allows the enzyme to diffuse two-dimensionally on a surface in a caterpillar-like fashion. However, there are also cellulases (mostly endoglucanases) that lack cellulose binding domains.

Both binding of substrates and catalysis depend on the three-dimensional structure of the enzyme which arises as a consequence of the level of protein folding. The amino acid sequence and arrangement of their residues that occur within the active site, the position where the substrate binds, may influence factors like binding affinity of ligands, stabilization of substrates within the active site and catalysis. The substrate structure is complementary to the precise active site structure of enzyme. Changes in the position of residues may result in distortion of one or more of these interactions. Additional factors like temperature, pH and metal ions influence the non-covalent interactions between enzyme structure. The Thermotoga maritima species make cellulases consisting of 2 β-sheets (protein structures) surrounding a central catalytic region which is the active-site. The enzyme is categorised as an endoglucanase, which internally cleaves β-1,4-glycosydic bonds in cellulose chains facilitating further degradation of the polymer. Different species in the same family as T. maritima make cellulases with different structures. Cellulases produced by the species Coprinopsis cinerea consists of seven protein strands in the shape of an enclosed tunnel called a β/α barrel. These enzymes hydrolyse the substrate carboxymethyl cellulose. Binding of the substrate in the active site induces a change in conformation which allows degradation of the molecule.

=== Cellulase complexes ===
In many bacteria, cellulases in vivo are complex enzyme structures organized in supramolecular complexes, the cellulosomes. They can contain, but are not limited to, five different enzymatic subunits representing namely endocellulases, exocellulases, cellobiases, oxidative cellulases and cellulose phosphorylases wherein only exocellulases and cellobiases participate in the actual hydrolysis of the β(1→4) linkage. The number of sub-units making up cellulosomes can also determine the rate of enzyme activity.

Multidomain cellulases are widespread among many taxonomic groups, however, cellulases from anaerobic bacteria, found in cellulosomes, have the most complex architecture consisting of different types of modules. For example, Clostridium cellulolyticum produces 13 GH9 modular cellulases containing a different number and arrangement of catalytic-domain (CD), carbohydrate-binding module (CBM), dockerin, linker and Ig-like domain.

The cellulase complex from Trichoderma reesei, for example, comprises a component labeled C1 (57,000 daltons) that separates the chains of crystalline cellulose, an endoglucanase (about 52,000 daltons), an exoglucanase (about 61,000 dalton), and a β-glucosidase (76,000 daltons).

Numerous "signature" sequences known as dockerins and cohesins have been identified in the genomes of bacteria that produce cellulosomes. Depending on their amino acid sequence and tertiary structures, cellulases are divided into clans and families.

Multimodular cellulases are more efficient than free enzyme (with only CD) due to synergism because of the close proximity between the enzyme and the cellulosic substrate. CBM are involved in binding of cellulose whereas glycosylated linkers provide flexibility to the CD for higher activity and protease protection, as well as increased binding to the cellulose surface.

== Mechanism of cellulolysis ==
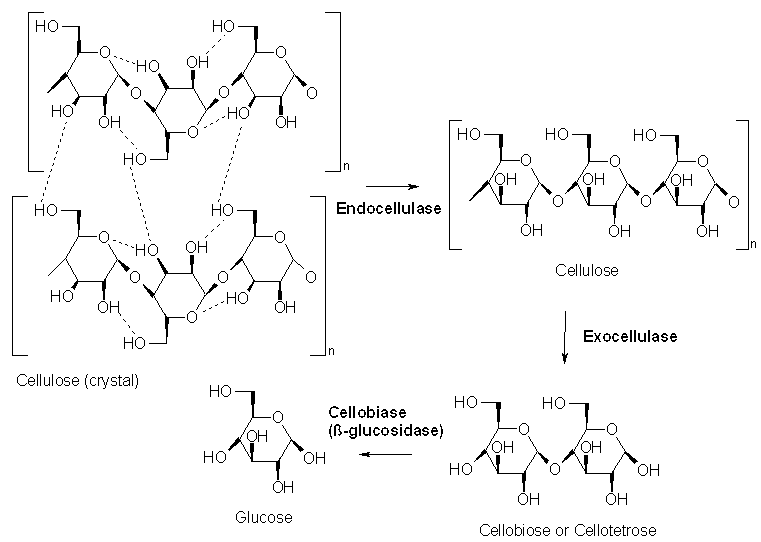
The three types of reaction catalyzed by cellulases:1. Breakage of the noncovalent interactions present in the amorphous structure of cellulose (endocellulase) 2. Hydrolysis of chain ends to break the polymer into smaller sugars (exocellulase) 3. Hydrolysis of disaccharides and tetrasaccharides into glucose (beta-glucosidase).

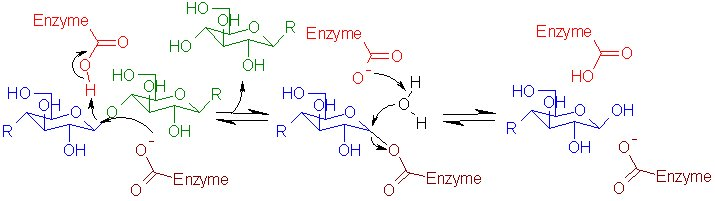
Mechanistic details of beta-glucosidase activity of cellulase

== Uses ==
Cellulase is used for commercial food processing in coffee. It performs hydrolysis of cellulose during drying of beans. Furthermore, cellulases are widely used in textile industry and in laundry detergents. They have also been used in the pulp and paper industry for various purposes, and they are even used for pharmaceutical applications. Cellulase is used in the fermentation of biomass into biofuels, although this process is relatively experimental at present.

=== Paper and pulp ===
Cellulases have a wide varierty of applications in the paper and pulp industry. In the production and recycling processes cellulases can be applied to improve debarking, pulping, bleaching, drainage or deinking.

The use of cellulase can also improve the quality of the paper. Cellulases affect the fiber morphology, which may lead to improved fibre-fibre bonding, resulting in increased fibre cohesion. Additional effects on the paper may include increased tensile strength, higher bulk, porosity and tissue softness.

=== Pharmaceutical ===
Cellulase is used in medicine as a treatment for phytobezoars, a form of cellulose bezoar found in the human stomach, and it has exhibited efficacy in degrading polymicrobial bacterial biofilms by hydrolyzing the β(1-4) glycosidic linkages within the structural, matrix exopolysaccharides of the extracellular polymeric substance (EPS).

=== Textiles ===
Various uses of cellulases in the textile industry include biostoning of jeans, polishing of textile fibres, softening of garments, removal of excess dye or the restoration of colour brightness.

Cellulase may also be incorporated in laundry detergents to remove loose fibrils on fabrics like cotton. Detergents with cellulase may have improved soil removal and may reduce the appearance of pilling on fabrics.

=== Agriculture ===
Cellulases can be used in the agricultural sector as a plant pathogen and for disease control. It is also applied to enhance seed germination and improvement of the root system, and may lead to improved soil quality and reduce the dependence on mineral fertilisers.

== Measurement ==
As the native substrate, cellulose, is a water-insoluble polymer, traditional reducing sugar assays using this substrate can not be employed for the measurement of cellulase activity. Analytical scientists have developed a number of alternative methods.

- DNSA Method Cellulase activity was determined by incubating 0.5 ml of supernatant with 0.5 ml of 1% carboxymethylcellulose (CMC) in 0.05M citrate buffer (pH 4.8) at 50 °C for 30 minutes. The reaction was terminated by the addition of 3 ml dinitrosalicylic acid reagent. Absorbance was read at 540 nm.

A viscometer can be used to measure the decrease in viscosity of a solution containing a water-soluble cellulose derivative such as carboxymethyl cellulose upon incubation with a cellulase sample. The decrease in viscosity is directly proportional to the cellulase activity. While such assays are very sensitive and specific for endo-cellulase (exo-acting cellulase enzymes produce little or no change in viscosity), they are limited by the fact that it is hard to define activity in conventional enzyme units (micromoles of substrate hydrolyzed or product produced per minute).

=== Cellooligosaccharide substrates ===
The lower DP cello-oligosaccharides (DP2-6) are sufficiently soluble in water to act as viable substrates for cellulase enzymes. However, as these substrates are themselves 'reducing sugars', they are not suitable for use in traditional reducing sugar assays because they generate a high 'blank' value. However their cellulase mediated hydrolysis can be monitored by HPLC or IC methods to gain valuable information on the substrate requirements of a particular cellulase enzyme.

=== Reduced cello-oligosaccharide substrates ===
Cello-oligosaccharides can be chemically reduced through the action of sodium borohydride to produce their corresponding sugar alcohols. These compounds do not react in reducing sugar assays but their hydrolysis products do. This makes borohydride reduced cello-oligosaccharides valuable substrates for the assay of cellulase using traditional reducing sugar assays such as the Nelson-Symogyi method.

=== Dyed polysaccharide substrates ===
These substrates can be subdivided into two classes-

- Insoluble chromogenic substrates: An insoluble cellulase substrate such as AZCL-HE-cellulose absorbs water to create gelatinous particles when placed in solution. This substrate is gradually depolymerised and solubilised by the action of cellulase. The reaction is terminated by adding an alkaline solution to stop enzyme activity and the reaction slurry is filtered or centrifuged. The colour in the filtrate or supernatant is measured and can be related to enzyme activity.
- Soluble chromogenic substrates: A cellulase sample is incubated with a water-soluble substrate such as azo-CM-cellulose, the reaction is terminated and high molecular weight, partially hydrolysed fragments are precipitated from solution with an organic solvent such as ethanol or methoxyethanol. The suspension is mixed thoroughly, centrifuged, and the colour in the supernatant solution (due to small, soluble, dyed fragments) is measured. With the aid of a standard curve, the enzyme activity can be determined.

=== Enzyme coupled reagents ===
Colourimetric and fluorimetric cellulase substrates can be used in the presence of ancillary β-glucosidase for the specific measurement of endo-cellulase activity

New reagents have been developed that allow for the specific measurement of endo-cellulase. These methods involve the use of functionalised oligosaccharide substrates in the presence of an ancillary enzyme. In the example shown, a cellulase enzyme is able to recognise the trisaccharide fragment of cellulose and cleave this unit. The ancillary enzyme present in the reagent mixture (β-glucosidase) then acts to hydrolyse the fragment containing the chromophore or fluorophore. The assay is terminated by the addition of a basic solution that stops the enzymatic reaction and deprotonates the liberated phenolic compound to produce the phenolate species. The cellulase activity of a given sample is directly proportional to the quantity of phenolate liberated which can be measured using a spectrophotometer. The acetal functionalisation on the non-reducing end of the trisaccharide substrate prevents the action of the ancillary β-glucosidase on the parent substrate.

== See also ==
- Cellulose 1,4-beta-cellobiosidase, an efficient cellulase
- Cellulase unit, a unit for quantifying cellulase activity
