= Glucan =

Class of organic compounds

A glucan is a polysaccharide derived from D-glucose, linked by glycosidic bonds. Glucans are noted in two forms: alpha glucans and beta glucans. Many beta-glucans are medically important. They represent a drug target for antifungal medications of the echinocandin class.

In the field of bacteriology, the term polyglucan is used to describe high molecular mass glucans. They are structural polysaccharide consisting of a long linear chain of several hundred to many thousands D-glucose monomers. The point of attachment is O-glycosidic bonds, where a glycosidic oxygen links the glycoside to the reducing end sugar. Polyglucans naturally occur in the cell walls of bacteria. Bacteria produce this polysaccharide in a cluster near the bacteria's cells. Polyglucan's are a source of beta-glucans. Structurally, beta 1.3-glucans are complex glucose homopolymers binding together in a beta-1,3 configuration.

== Types ==
The following are glucans (The α- and β- and numbers clarify the type of O-glycosidic bond and the specific carbons involved):

=== Alpha ===
- dextran, α-1,6-glucan with α-1,3-branches
- floridean starch, α-1,4- and α-1,6-glucan
- glycogen, α-1,4- and α-1,6-glucan
- pullulan, α-1,4- and α-1,6-glucan
- starch, a mixture of amylose and amylopectin, both α-1,4- and α-1,6-glucans
- α-1,2-glucan, α-1,2-glucan

=== Beta ===
- cellulose, β-1,4-glucan
- chrysolaminarin, β-1,3-glucan
- curdlan, β-1,3-glucan
- laminarin, β-1,3- and β-1,6-glucan
- lentinan, a strictly purified β-1,6:β-1,3-glucan from Lentinus edodes
- lichenin, β-1,3- and β-1,4-glucan
- oat beta-glucan, β-1,3- and β-1,4-glucan
- pleuran, β-1,3- and β-1,6-glucan isolated from Pleurotus ostreatus
- zymosan, β-1,3-glucan

== Properties ==
Properties of glucans include resistance to oral acids/enzyme and water insolubility. Glucans extracted from grains tend to be both soluble and insoluble.

== Structure ==
Glucans are polysaccharides derived from glucose monomers. The monomers are linked by glycosidic bonds. Four types of glucose-based polysaccharides are possible: 1,6- (starch), 1,4- (cellulose), 1,3- (laminarin), and 1,2-bonded glucans.

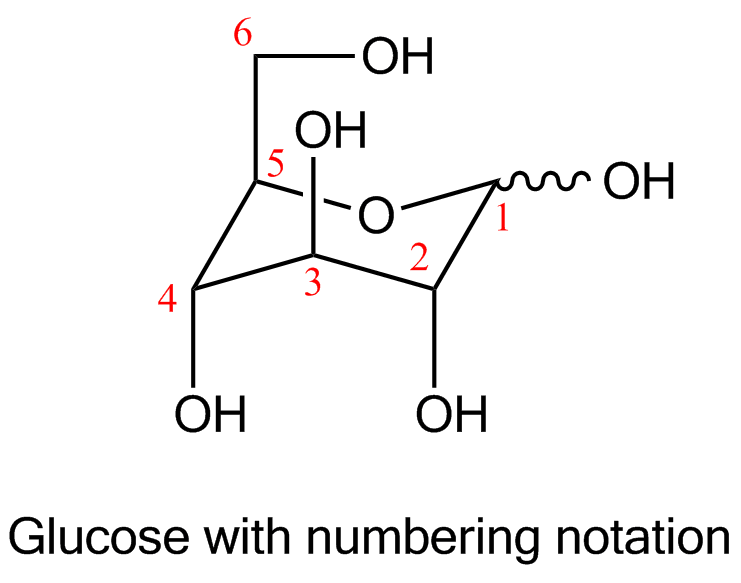

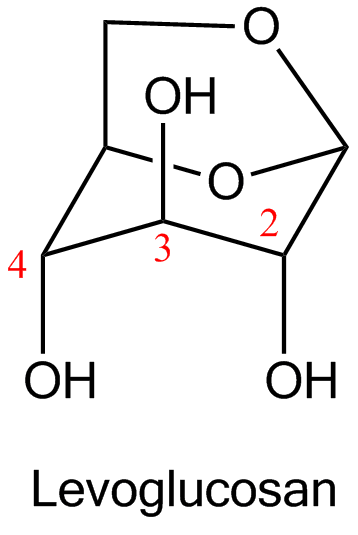

The first representatives of main chain unhydrolysable linear polymers made up of levoglucosan units were synthesized in 1985 by anionic polymerization of 2,3-epoxy derivatives of levoglucosan (1,6;2,3-dianhydro-4-O-alkyl-β-D-mannopyranoses).

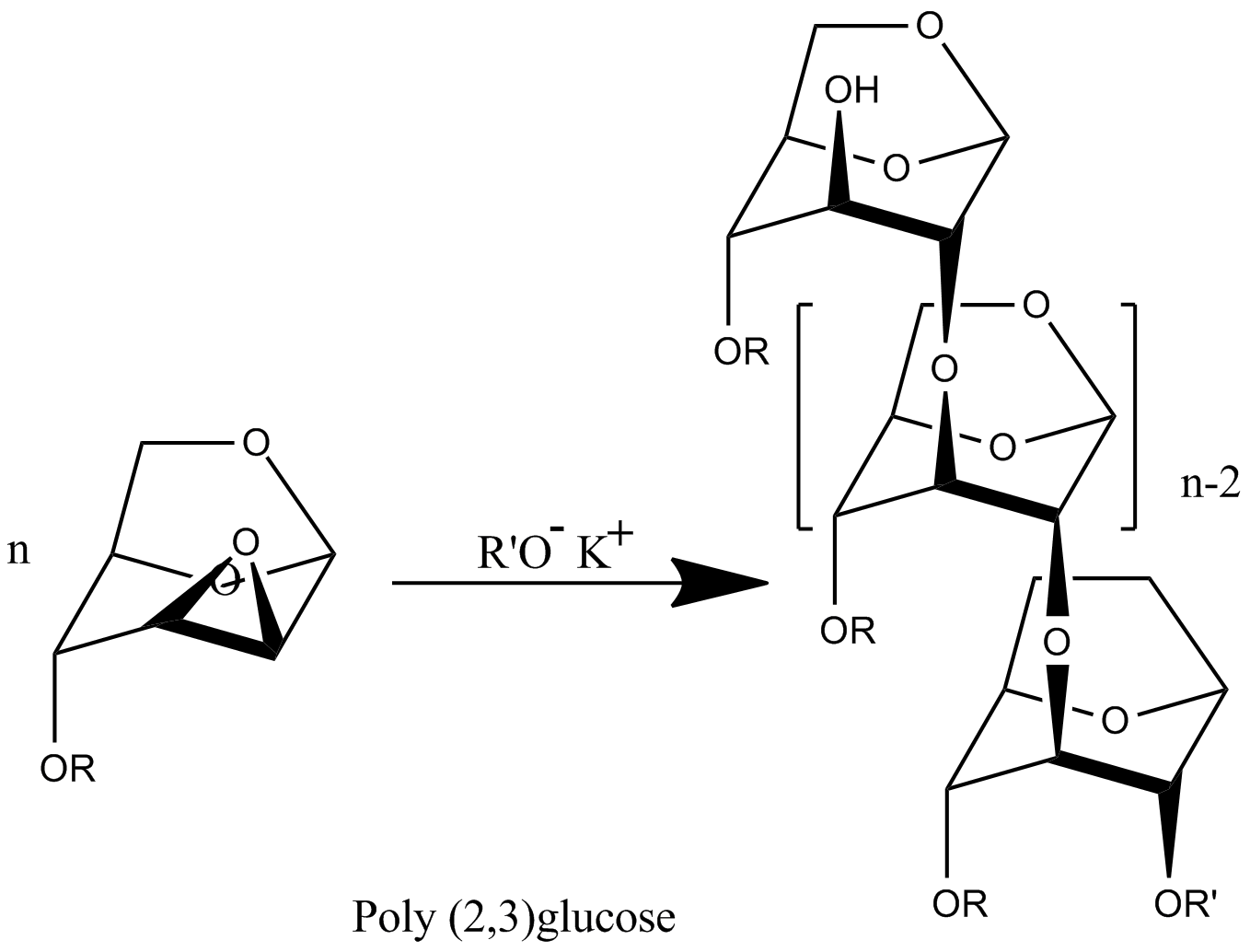
2,3-Polymer

A wide range of unique monomers with different radical R can be synthesized. There were synthesized polymers with R= -CH_{3}, -CH_{2}CHCH_{2}, and -CH_{2}C_{6}H_{5}. Investigation of the polymerization kinetics of those derivatives, molecular weight and molecular-weight distribution showed that the polymerization has the features of a living polymerization system. The process takes place without termination and transfer of the polymer chain with a degree of polymerization equal to the mole ratio of the monomer to the initiator. Accordingly, the upper value molecular weight polymer determines only degree of purification system what determine the presence in the system uncontrollable amount of terminators of polymer chains.

Poly(2–3)-D-glucose was synthesized proceeds by transformation of benzyl (R= -CH_{2}C_{6}H_{5}) functionalized polymer.

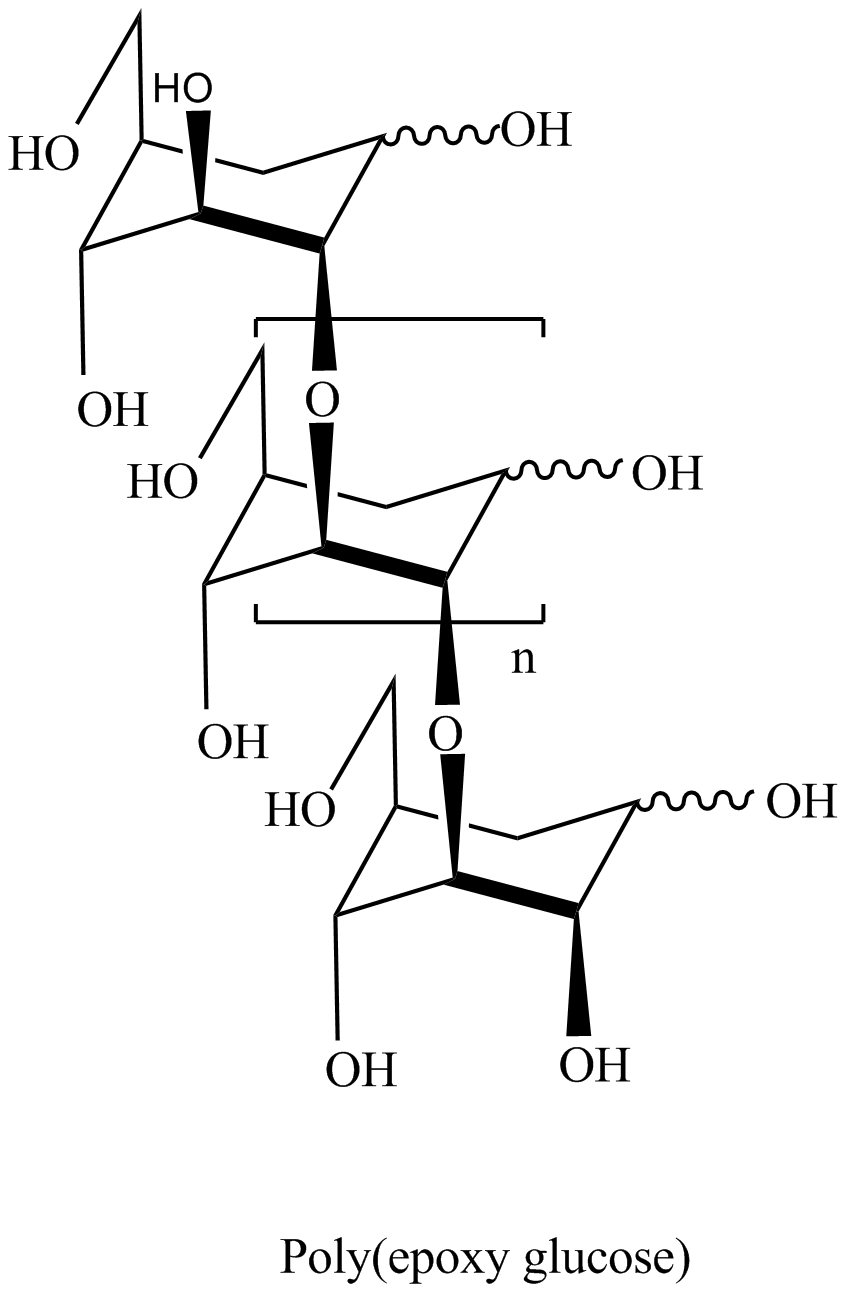
Polyglucose

Polymerization of 3,4-epoxy levoglucosan (1,6;3,4-dianhydro-2-O-alkyl-β-D-galactopyranose) results in formation 3,4-bounded levoglucosan polymer.

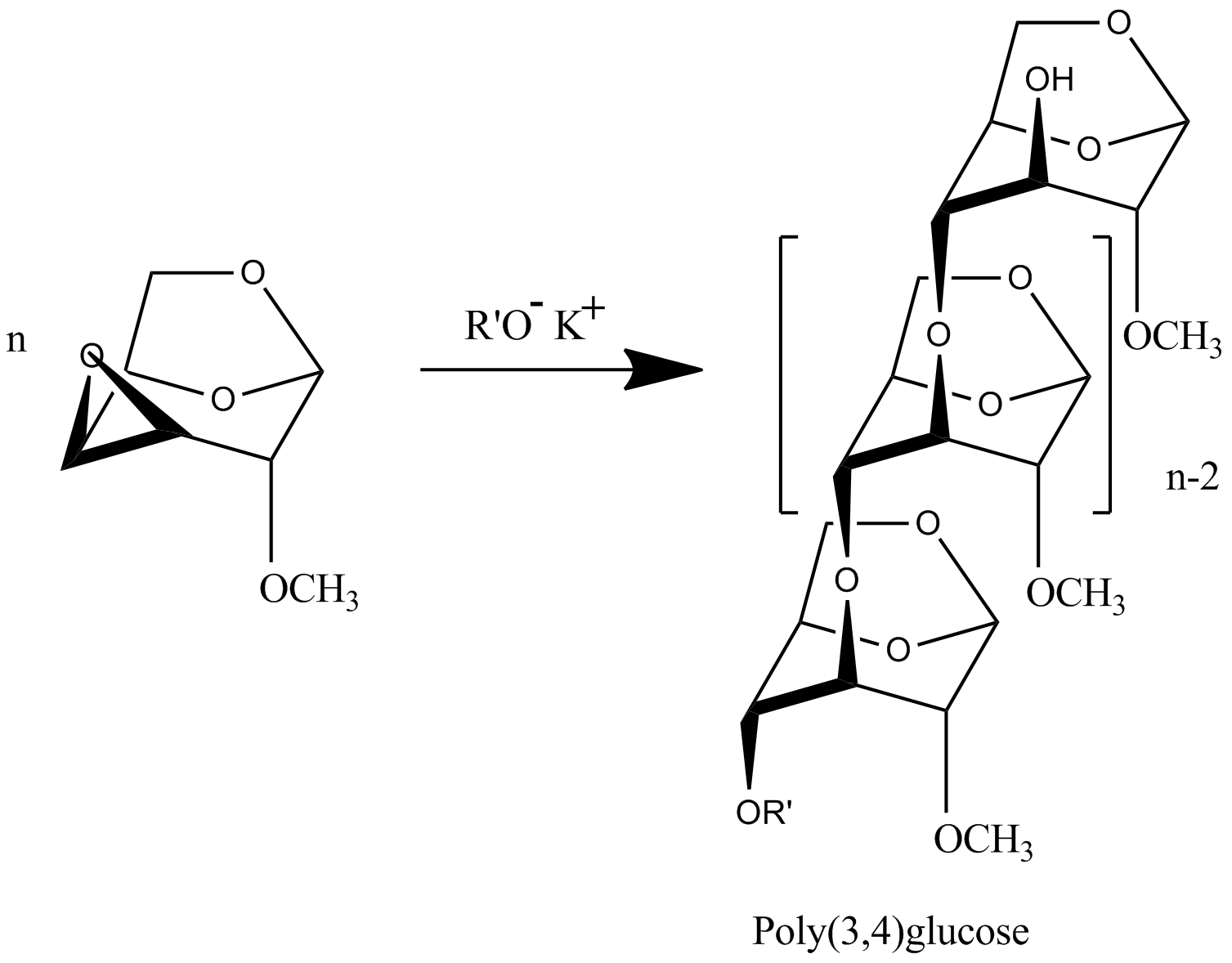
3,4-Polymer

The presence of 1,6-anhydro structure in every unit of polymer chains allows researchers to apply all spectra of well developed methods of carbohydrate chemistry with formation of highly intriguing biological application polymers. The polymers are the only known regular polyethers built up of carbohydrate units in main polymer chain.

=== Biochemical synthesis ===
Photosynthetic microorganisms, such as cyanobacteria and microalgae, are currently used for their polyglucan production. Since these organisms have high-photosynthetic activity and whole-year cultivation without utilization of arable land. The cultivation is done by modifying the nutrient supply and replacing the growth medium of the cyanobacteria and green microalgae since the control and manipulation of polyglucan metabolism necessitates the elucidation of the polyglucan production mechanism. These activities promote the growth of polyglucans from these organisms.

Several cyanobacteria enzymes could synthesis α-1,2-glucan.

== Functions ==
Glucans serve a diverse set of functions. Within the cell, certain glucans store energy, fortify cellular structure, behave in recognition, and enhance virulence in pathogenic organisms.

Glycogen and starch are notable glucans responsible for storing energy for the cell. Receptor molecules of the immune system, such as the Complement receptor 3, or CR3, and CD5 receptor, recognize and bind to beta-glucans on invading cell surfaces.

Polyglucans are utilized as a carbon source for microbial fermentation. Although polyglucan production has so far been promoted by nutrient limitation, it must be further enhanced to accommodate market demand. The combined strategies of cultivation design and genetic engineering are used for polyglucan productivity for bioethanol production. Polyglucans are also involved in another sector of the energy industry, acting as biopolymers to increase oil recovery. The polysaccharide is attached to the bacteria cells and then mixed in an alkali solution such as sodium hydroxide to become soluble. After which, it is then pumped into the injection well. The reason it needs to be a fluid is so you can pump the polysaccharides into the reservoir, but then the polysaccharide needs to gel/solidify/precipitate in situ upon addition of another chemical in order to plug up the pore. The biopolymer is then combined and injected with water until it fills up at least 30% of the empty pores. Next, there is an injection of an acid solution or CO_{2} forming HCO^{−}_{3}. This neutralizes the solution and allows for the precipitation of the biopolymer, polyglucans, inside the high-permeability zones. Evidence shows that the application of this polyglucan can reduce the permeability of approximately 80% of the high-permeability zones. Oil companies are able to benefit from the decreased permeability because oil tends to flow in areas with the highest permeability.

They can also serve as dietary supplements. A 2025 study concluded that the "combination of propolis extract with glucan particles increases propolis solubility and bioactivity."

== Clinical significance ==
The immune-modulation action of polyglucans has been known for over 40 years, after experiments showed that they stimulated the activation of macrophages through the activation of the complement system. The detection of the (1,3)-β-D-glucan in blood is also used as a means of identifying invasive or disseminated fungal infections. Although, a positive test does not render a diagnosis, and a negative test does not rule out infection. This test can aid in the detection of Aspergillus, Candida, and Pneumocystis jirovecii.

== See also ==
- Glucanase
