= Glucan endo-1,3-β-D-glucosidase =

Identifiers
- EC no.: 3.2.1.39
- CAS no.: 9025-37-0

Databases
- IntEnz: IntEnz view
- BRENDA: BRENDA entry
- ExPASy: NiceZyme view
- KEGG: KEGG entry
- MetaCyc: metabolic pathway
- PRIAM: profile
- PDB structures: RCSB PDB PDBe PDBsum
Search
- PMC: articles
- PubMed: articles
- NCBI: proteins

Glucan endo-1,3-β-D-glucosidase (EC 3.2.1.39, endo-1,3-β-glucanase, laminarinase, laminaranase, oligo-1,3-glucosidase, callase, beta-1,3-glucanase, Kitalase (trademark), 1,3-β-D-glucan 3-glucanohydrolase, endo-(1,3)-β-D-glucanase, (1→3)-β-glucan 3-glucanohydrolase, endo-1,3-β-D-glucanase, endo-1,3-β-glucosidase, 1,3-β-D-glucan glucanohydrolase) is an enzyme with systematic name 3-β-D-glucan glucanohydrolase. This enzyme catalyses the following chemical reaction

Hydrolysis of (1→3)-β-D-glucosidic linkages in (1→3)-β-D-glucans

This enzyme is marginally active on mixed-link (1→3,1→4)-β-D-glucans.
