= Cellulose 1,4-β-cellobiosidase (non-reducing end) =

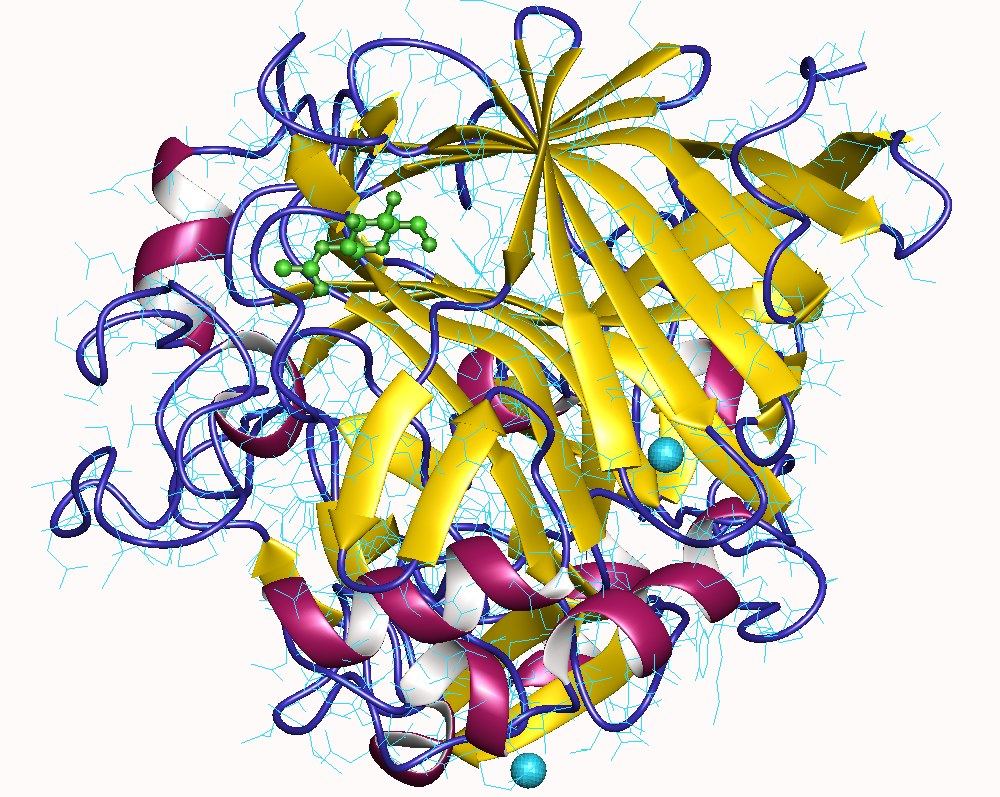
- Cellobiohydrolase monomer, Trichoderma reesei

Identifiers
- EC no.: 3.2.1.91
- CAS no.: 37329-65-0

Databases
- IntEnz: IntEnz view
- BRENDA: BRENDA entry
- ExPASy: NiceZyme view
- KEGG: KEGG entry
- MetaCyc: metabolic pathway
- PRIAM: profile
- PDB structures: RCSB PDB PDBe PDBsum
Search
- PMC: articles
- PubMed: articles
- NCBI: proteins

Cellulose 1,4-β-cellobiosidase (EC 3.2.1.91, exo-cellobiohydrolase, β-1,4-glucan cellobiohydrolase, β-1,4-glucan cellobiosylhydrolase, 1,4-β-glucan cellobiosidase, exoglucanase, avicelase, CBH 1, C1 cellulase, cellobiohydrolase I, cellobiohydrolase, exo-β-1,4-glucan cellobiohydrolase, 1,4-β-D-glucan cellobiohydrolase, cellobiosidase) is an enzyme of interest for its capability of converting cellulose to useful chemicals, particularly cellulosic ethanol.

The main technological impediment to widespread utilization of cellulose for fuels is still the lack of low-cost technologies to convert cellulose. One solution is the use of organisms that are capable of performing this conversion. Development of such organisms, such as Saccharomyces cerevisiae which is capable of secreting high levels of cellobiohydrolases, is already underway. Cellobiohydrolases are exoglucanases derived from fungi.

The systematic name is 4-β-D-glucan cellobiohydrolase (non-reducing end).

== Function ==
This enzyme catalyses the hydrolysis of (1→4)-β-D-glucosidic linkages in cellulose and cellotetraose, releasing cellobiose from the non-reducing ends of the chains.

CBH1 from yeast, for example, is composed of a carbohydrate binding site, a linker region and a catalytic domain. Once the cellulose chain is bound, it is strung through a tunnel-shaped active site where the cellulose is broken down into two-sugar segments called cellobiose. The structure of the enzyme can be seen in the first figure. The second figure shows the activity of the enzyme, and shows both cellulose binding to the enzyme, as well as the product of this step, cellobiose. Research suggests, however, that the activity of CBH1 is very strong inhibited by the product, cellobiose. Determination of an enzyme that is not as strongly inhibited by the product or finding a way to remove cellobiose from the environment of the enzyme are just more examples of the many challenges that face the use of these enzymes for the creation of biofuels.

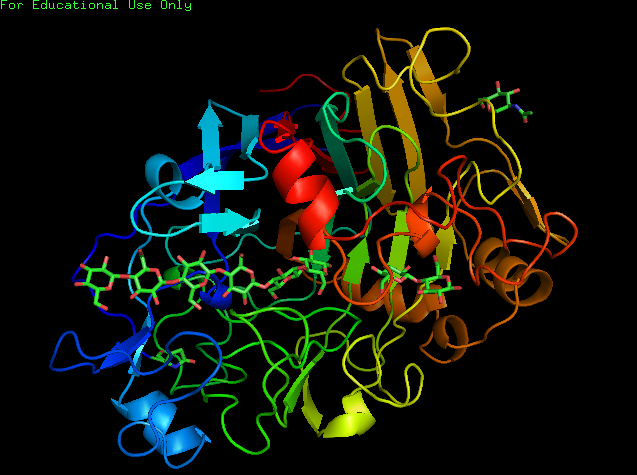
CBH1 Structure, generated using pymol

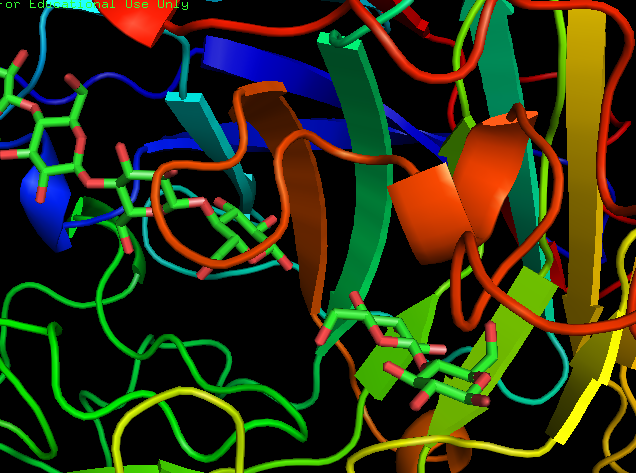
CBH1 zoomed in on the active site where cellulose is cleaved into cellobiose, generated using pymol.

After above step, the process for creating ethanol is as follows: 3. Separation of sugars from other plant material. 4. Microbial fermentation of the sugar solution to create alcohol. 5. Distillation to purify the products and produce roughly 9% pure alcohol 6. Further purification to bring the ethanol purity to roughly 99.5%

Some notable improvements have been made in this area as well. For example, a strain of yeast capable of producing its own cellulose digesting enzyme has been developed, which would allow the cellulose degradation and the fermentation steps could be at once. This is an important development in the sense that it makes large scale, industrial applications more feasible.
