= Lichenin =

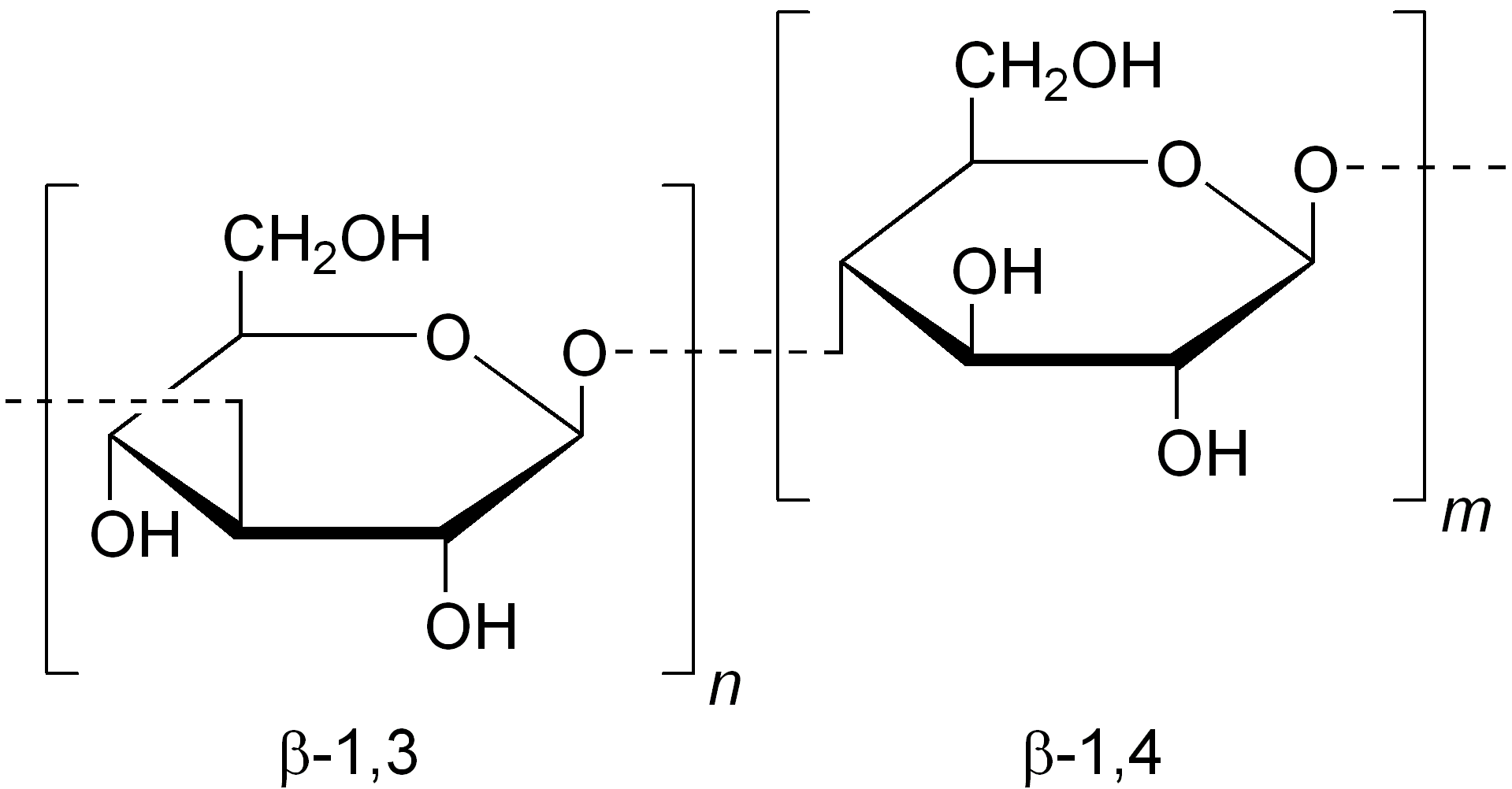

Names
- Other names Lichenan; Moss starch

Identifiers
CAS Number	1402-10-4
ChEBI	CHEBI:6452
ChemSpider	none
ECHA InfoCard	100.014.323
PubChem CID	439241 monomer
UNII	M7F3LRN53I
CompTox Dashboard (EPA)	DTXSID40930736

Properties
Chemical formula	(C_{6}H_{10}O_{5})_{x}
Molar mass	Variable
- Except where otherwise noted, data are given for materials in their standard state (at 25 °C [77 °F], 100 kPa). verify (what is ?) Infobox references

Lichenin, also known as lichenan or moss starch, is a complex glucan occurring in certain species of lichens and grains. It can be extracted from Cetraria islandica (Iceland moss). It has been studied since about 1957.

In oats and barley, lichenin can make up 6 to 8% of dry matter, whereas wheat and rye contain around 2% at the most.

It produces a gelatinous solution when boiled in water and subsequently cooled. Since humans lack the enzyme lichenase, and thus are unable to catabolize lichenin, it serves as dietary fiber. Lichenin is also used as a mucoactive agent.

== Structure ==
Chemically, lichenin is a mixed-linkage glucan, consisting of repeating glucose units linked by β-1,3 and β-1,4 glycosidic bonds.

== Uses ==
It is an important carbohydrate for reindeers and northern flying squirrels, which eat the lichen Bryoria fremontii.

It can be extracted by digesting Iceland moss in a cold, weak solution of carbonate of soda for some time, and then boiling. By this process the lichenin is dissolved and on cooling separates as a colorless jelly. Iodine imparts no color to it.

== Other uses of the name ==
In his 1960 novel Trouble with Lichen, John Wyndham gives the name Lichenin to a biochemical extract of lichen used to extend life expectancy beyond 300 years.
