= List of carbohydrate-binding modules =

CBM_1
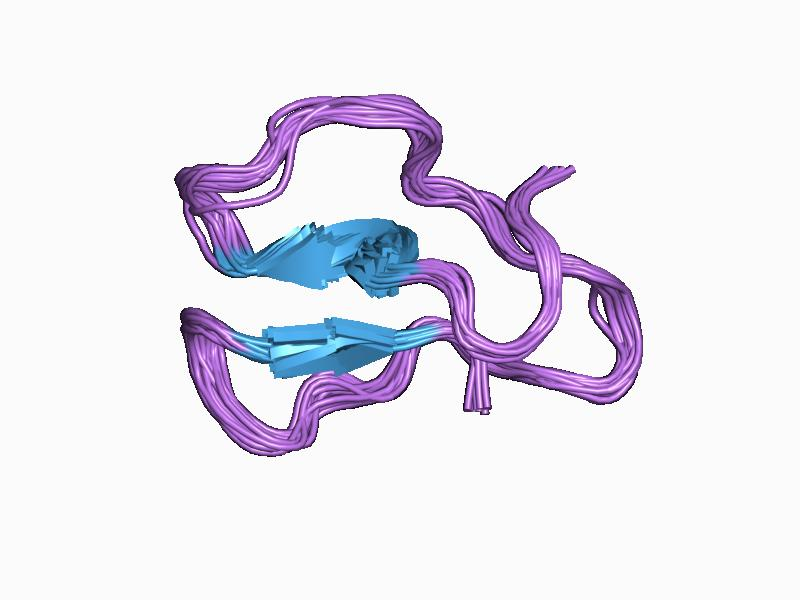
- three-dimensional structures of three engineered cellulose-binding domains of cellobiohydrolase i from trichoderma reesei, nmr, 18 structures

Identifiers
- Symbol: CBM_1
- Pfam: PF00734
- Pfam clan: CL0083
- ECOD: 387.1.1
- InterPro: IPR000254
- PROSITE: PDOC00486
- SCOP2: 1cel / SCOPe / SUPFAM
- CAZy: CBM1
Available protein structures:
- PDB: IPR000254 PF00734 (ECOD; PDBsum)
- AlphaFold: IPR000254; PF00734

This is a list of carbohydrate-binding modules, which are protein domains found in carbohydrate-interacting proteins.

CBM_2
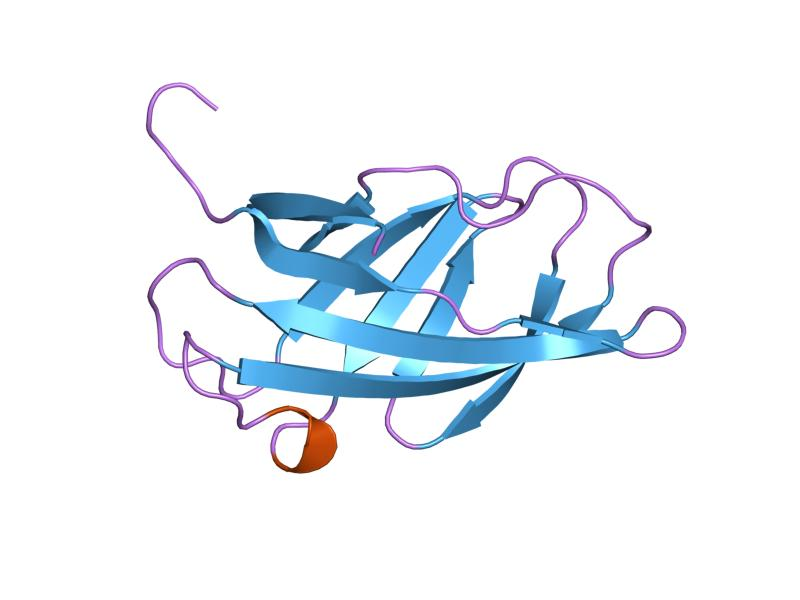
- solution structure of a cellulose binding domain from cellulomonas fimi by nuclear magnetic resonance spectroscopy

Identifiers
- Symbol: CBM_2
- Pfam: PF00553
- Pfam clan: CL0203
- ECOD: 11.1.5
- InterPro: IPR001919
- PROSITE: PDOC00485
- SCOP2: 1exg / SCOPe / SUPFAM
- CAZy: CBM2
Available protein structures:
- PDB: IPR001919 PF00553 (ECOD; PDBsum)
- AlphaFold: IPR001919; PF00553

CBM_3
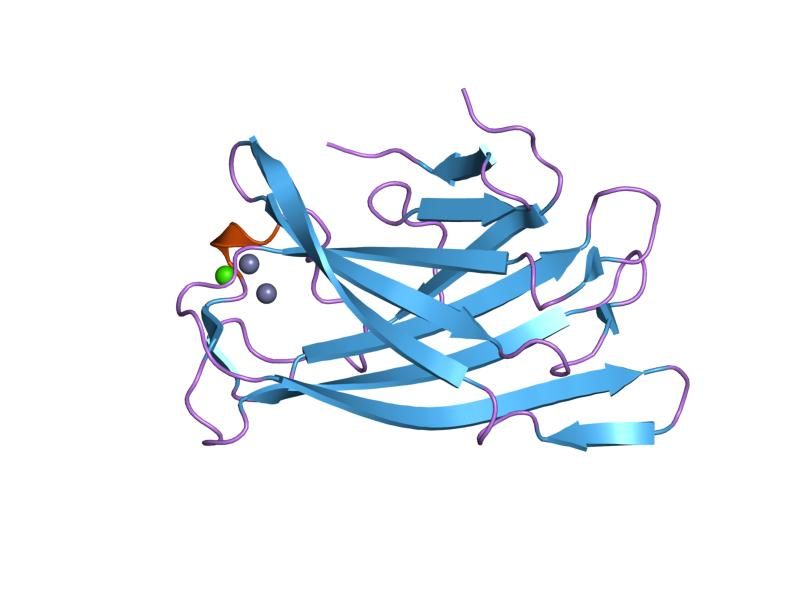
- crystal structure of a family iiia cbd from clostridium cellulolyticum

Identifiers
- Symbol: CBM_3
- Pfam: PF00942
- Pfam clan: CL0203
- ECOD: 11.1.5
- InterPro: IPR001956
- SCOP2: 1nbc / SCOPe / SUPFAM
- CAZy: CBM3
Available protein structures:
- PDB: IPR001956 PF00942 (ECOD; PDBsum)
- AlphaFold: IPR001956; PF00942

CBM_5/12
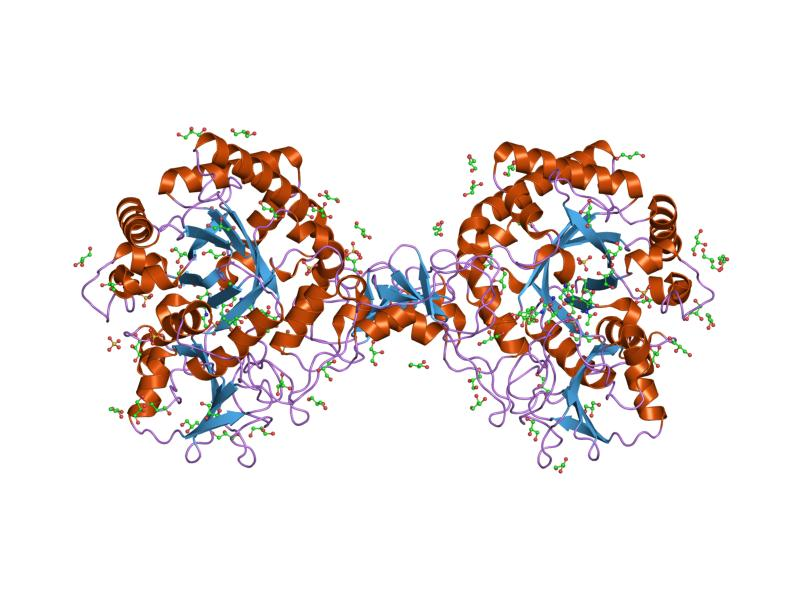
- interactions of a family 18 chitinase with the designed inhibitor hm508, and its degradation product, chitobiono-delta-lactone

Identifiers
- Symbol: CBM_5_12
- Pfam: PF02839
- ECOD: 64.3.1
- InterPro: IPR003610
- SCOP2: 1ed7 / SCOPe / SUPFAM
- CAZy: CBM12
Available protein structures:
- PDB: IPR003610 PF02839 (ECOD; PDBsum)
- AlphaFold: IPR003610; PF02839

CBM_6
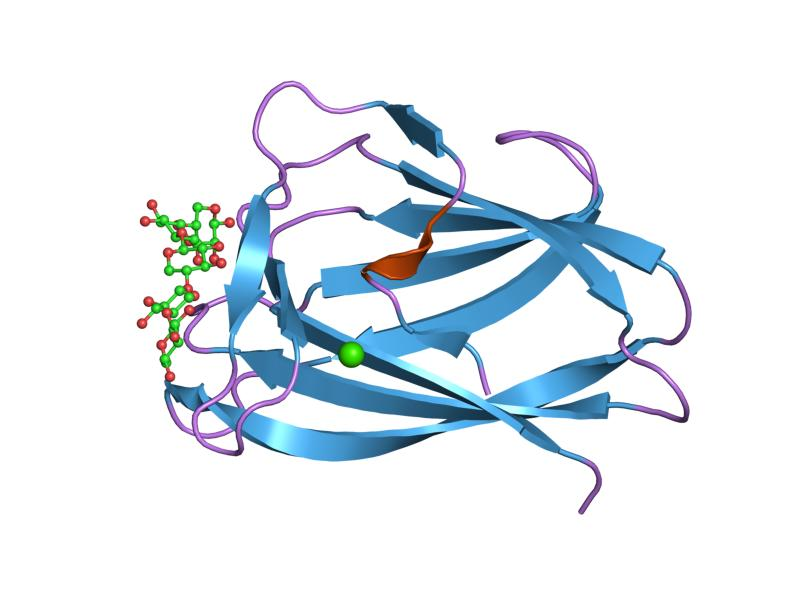
- cbm6ct from clostridium thermocellum in complex with xylopentaose

Identifiers
- Symbol: CBM_6
- Pfam: PF03422
- Pfam clan: CL0202
- ECOD: 10.32.1
- InterPro: IPR005084
- SCOP2: 1gmm / SCOPe / SUPFAM
- CAZy: CBM6
Available protein structures:
- PDB: IPR005084 PF03422 (ECOD; PDBsum)
- AlphaFold: IPR005084; PF03422

CBM_4/9
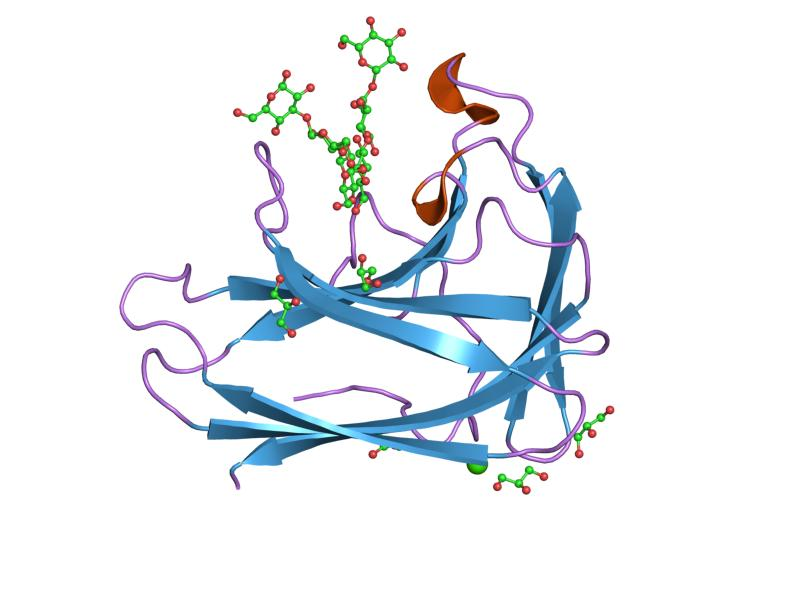
- cbm4 structure and function

Identifiers
- Symbol: CBM_4_9
- Pfam: PF02018
- Pfam clan: CL0202
- ECOD: 10.32.1
- InterPro: IPR003305
- SCOP2: 1ulp / SCOPe / SUPFAM
- CAZy: CBM22
Available protein structures:
- PDB: IPR003305 PF02018 (ECOD; PDBsum)
- AlphaFold: IPR003305; PF02018

CBM_10
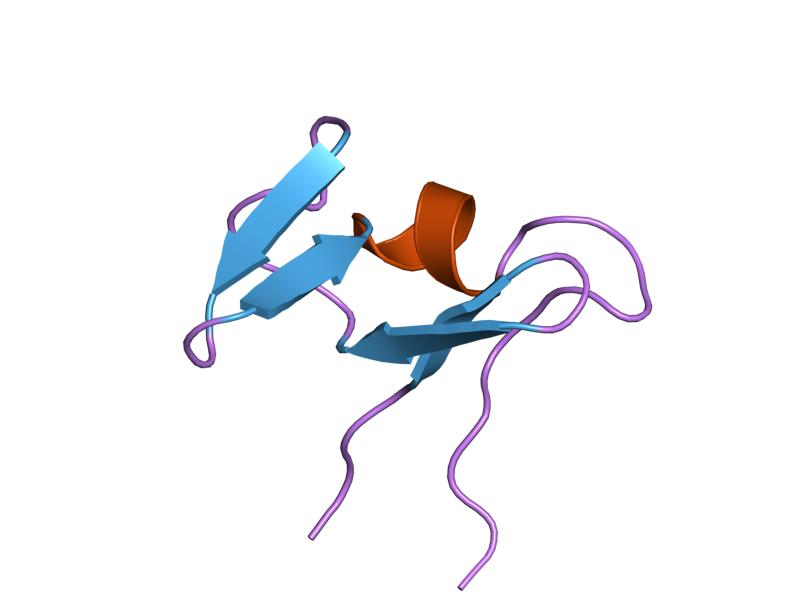
- solution structure of type x cbm

Identifiers
- Symbol: CBM_10
- Pfam: PF02013
- ECOD: 908.1.1
- InterPro: IPR002883
- SCOP2: 1qld / SCOPe / SUPFAM
- CAZy: CBM10
Available protein structures:
- PDB: IPR002883 PF02013 (ECOD; PDBsum)
- AlphaFold: IPR002883; PF02013

CBM_11
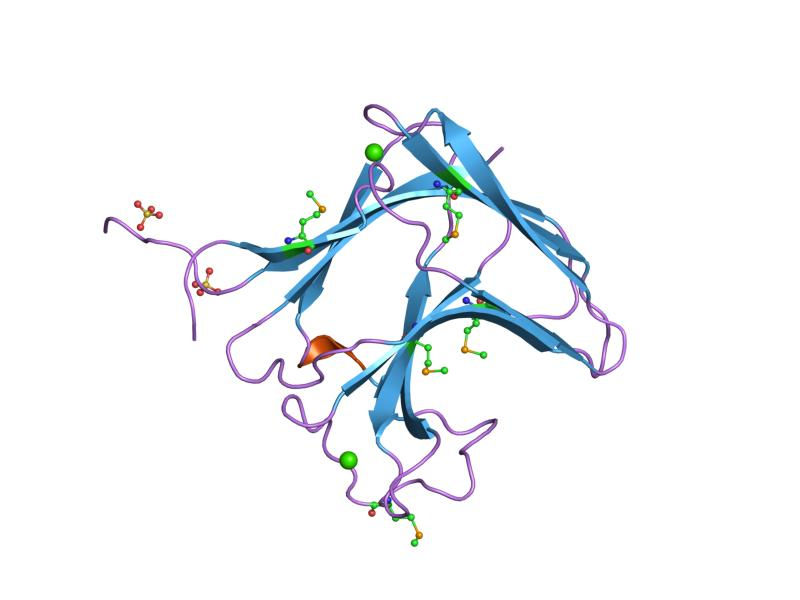
- family 11 carbohydrate-binding module of cellulosomal cellulase lic26a-cel5e of clostridium thermocellum

Identifiers
- Symbol: CBM_11
- Pfam: PF03425
- Pfam clan: CL0202
- ECOD: 10.32.1
- InterPro: IPR005087
- CAZy: CBM11
Available protein structures:
- PDB: IPR005087 PF03425 (ECOD; PDBsum)
- AlphaFold: IPR005087; PF03425

CBM_14

Identifiers
- Symbol: CBM_14
- Pfam: PF01607
- Pfam clan: CL0155
- ECOD: 394.1.1
- InterPro: IPR002557
- SCOP2: 1dqc / SCOPe / SUPFAM
- CAZy: CBM14
Available protein structures:
- PDB: IPR002557 PF01607 (ECOD; PDBsum)
- AlphaFold: IPR002557; PF01607

CBM_15
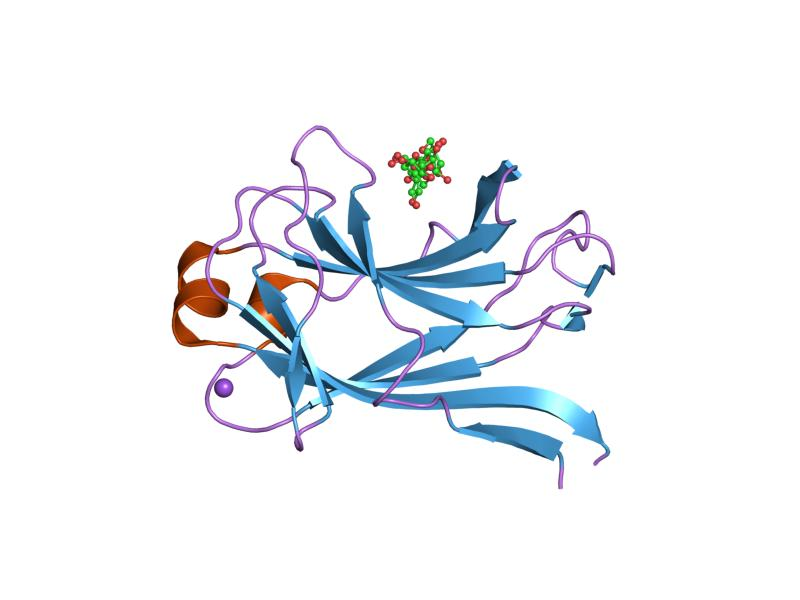
- xylan-binding module cbm15

Identifiers
- Symbol: CBM_15
- Pfam: PF03426
- Pfam clan: CL0202
- ECOD: 10.32.1
- InterPro: IPR005088
- SCOP2: 1gny / SCOPe / SUPFAM
- CAZy: CBM15
Available protein structures:
- PDB: IPR005088 PF03426 (ECOD; PDBsum)
- AlphaFold: IPR005088; PF03426

CBM_17/28
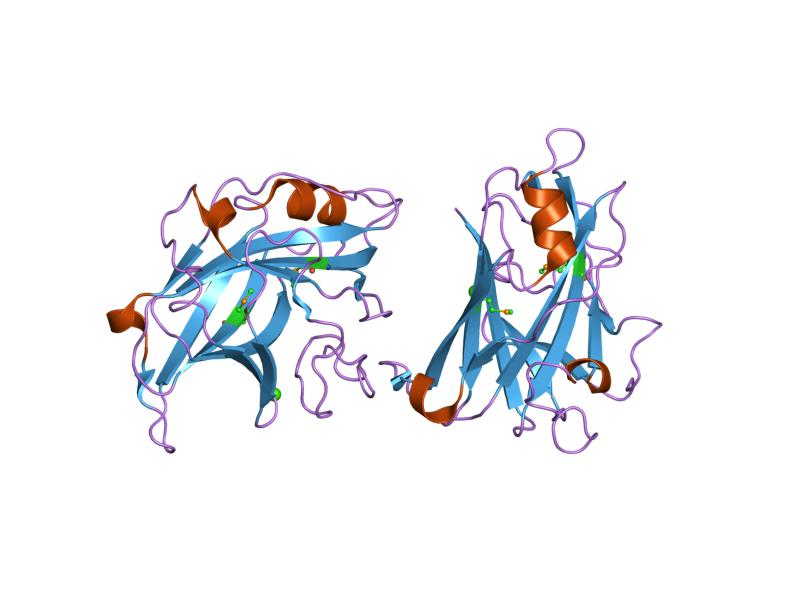
- structure of fam17 carbohydrate binding module from clostridium cellulovorans

Identifiers
- Symbol: CBM_17_28
- Pfam: PF03424
- Pfam clan: CL0202
- ECOD: 10.32.1
- InterPro: IPR005086
- SCOP2: 1g0c / SCOPe / SUPFAM
- CAZy: CBM28
Available protein structures:
- PDB: IPR005086 PF03424 (ECOD; PDBsum)
- AlphaFold: IPR005086; PF03424

Chitin_bind_1 (CBM18)
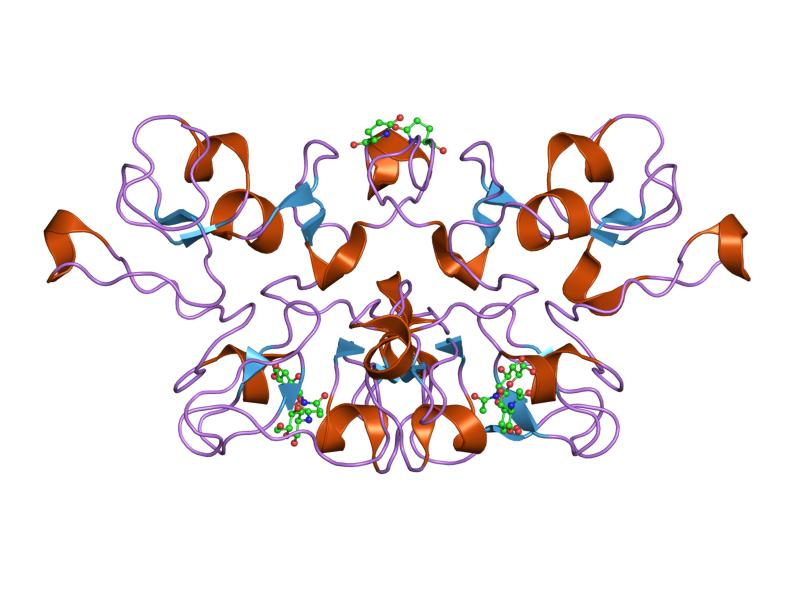
- crystal structure analysis of crosslinked-wga3/glcnacbeta1,4glcnac complex

Identifiers
- Symbol: Chitin_bind_1
- Pfam: PF00187
- ECOD: 387.1.2
- InterPro: IPR001002
- PROSITE: PDOC00025
- SCOP2: 1wgt / SCOPe / SUPFAM
- CAZy: CBM18
Available protein structures:
- PDB: IPR001002 PF00187 (ECOD; PDBsum)
- AlphaFold: IPR001002; PF00187

CBM_19

Identifiers
- Symbol: CBM_19
- Pfam: PF03427
- Pfam clan: CL0155
- InterPro: IPR005089
- CAZy: CBM19
Available protein structures:
- PDB: IPR005089 PF03427 (ECOD; PDBsum)
- AlphaFold: IPR005089; PF03427

CBM_20
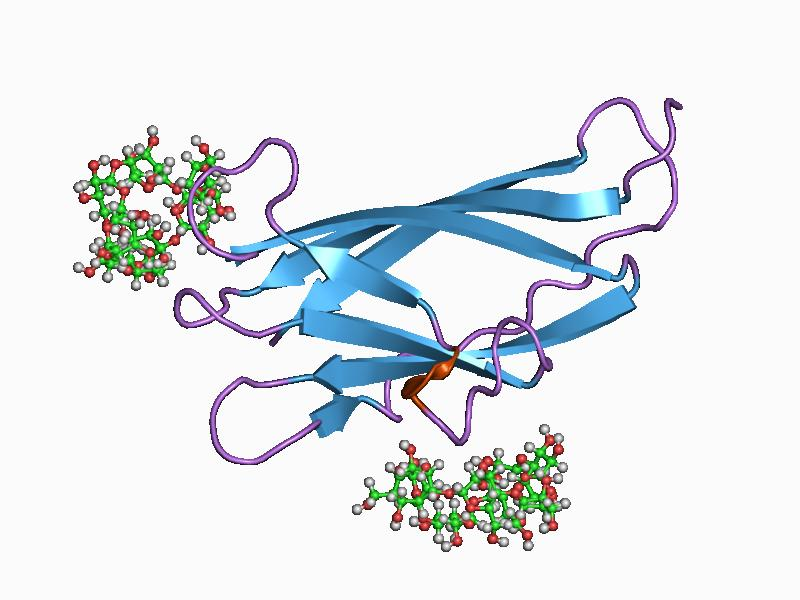
- glucoamylase, granular starch-binding domain complex with cyclodextrin, nmr, minimized average structure

Identifiers
- Symbol: CBM_20
- Pfam: PF00686
- Pfam clan: CL0369
- ECOD: 11.1.4
- InterPro: IPR002044
- SCOP2: 1cdg / SCOPe / SUPFAM
- CAZy: CBM20
Available protein structures:
- PDB: IPR002044 PF00686 (ECOD; PDBsum)
- AlphaFold: IPR002044; PF00686

CBM_21

Identifiers
- Symbol: CBM_21
- Pfam: PF03370
- ECOD: 11.1.1
- InterPro: IPR005036
- CAZy: CBM21
Available protein structures:
- PDB: IPR005036 PF03370 (ECOD; PDBsum)
- AlphaFold: IPR005036; PF03370

CBM_25

Identifiers
- Symbol: CBM_25
- Pfam: PF03423
- ECOD: 11.1.4
- InterPro: IPR005085
- CAZy: CBM25
Available protein structures:
- PDB: IPR005085 PF03423 (ECOD; PDBsum)
- AlphaFold: IPR005085; PF03423

CBM27
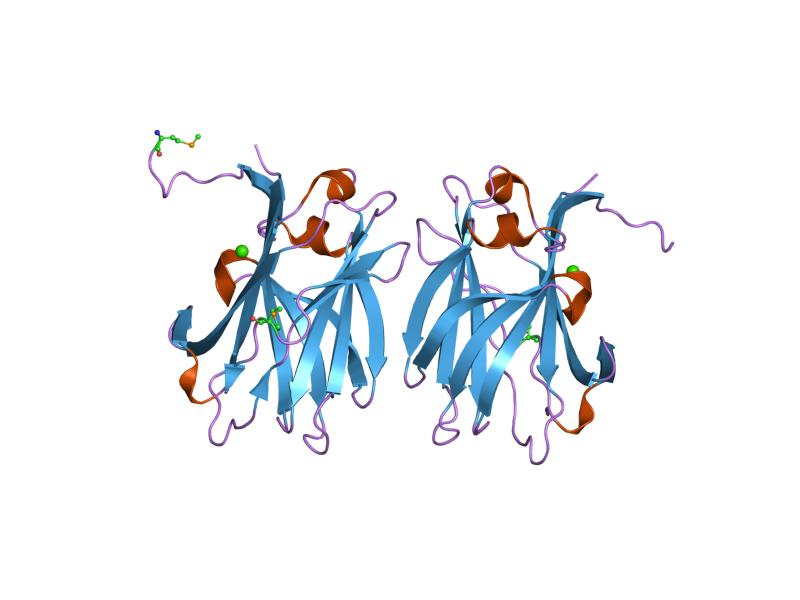
- structural and thermodynamic dissection of specific mannan recognition by a carbohydrate-binding module, tmcbm27

Identifiers
- Symbol: CBM27
- Pfam: PF09212
- ECOD: 10.32.1
- InterPro: IPR015295
- SCOP2: 1oh4 / SCOPe / SUPFAM
Available protein structures:
- PDB: IPR015295 PF09212 (ECOD; PDBsum)
- AlphaFold: IPR015295; PF09212

Chitin_bind_3 (CBM33)
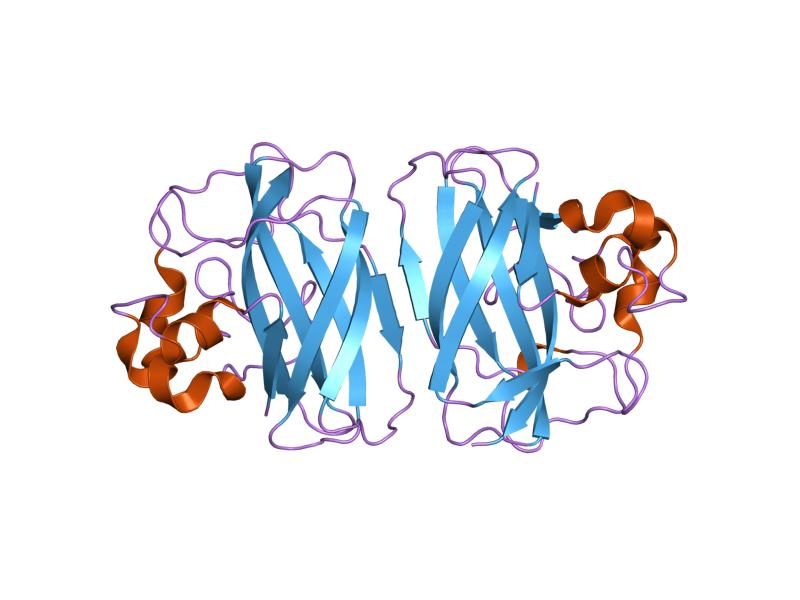
- crystal structure of the serratia marcescens chitin-binding protein cbp21 y54a mutant.

Identifiers
- Symbol: Chitin_bind_3
- Pfam: PF03067
- Pfam clan: CL0159
- ECOD: 11.1.1
- InterPro: IPR004302
- CAZy: CBM33
Available protein structures:
- PDB: IPR004302 PF03067 (ECOD; PDBsum)
- AlphaFold: IPR004302; PF03067

CBM_48
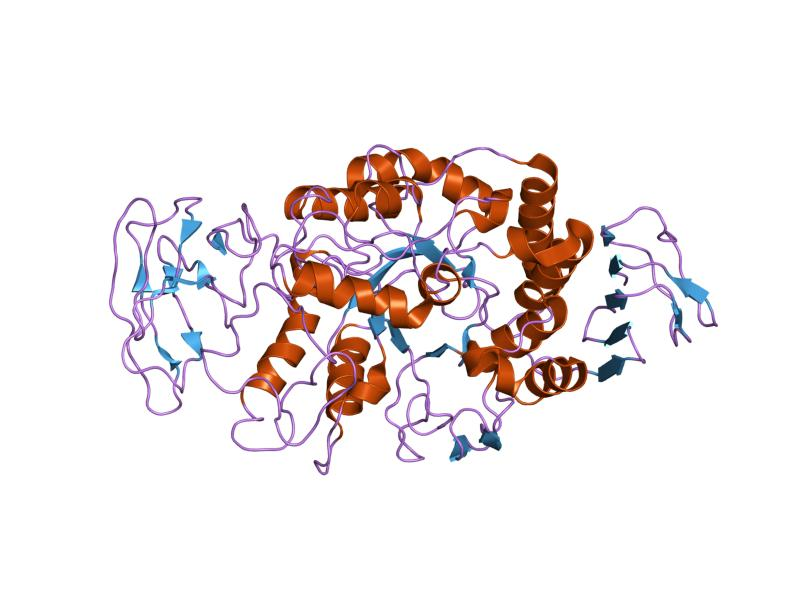
- crystal structure of glycosyltrehalose trehalohydrolase from sulfolobus solfataricus

Identifiers
- Symbol: CBM_48
- Pfam: PF02922
- Pfam clan: CL0369
- ECOD: 11.1.1
- InterPro: IPR004193
- SCOP2: 1bf2 / SCOPe / SUPFAM
- CAZy: CBM48
Available protein structures:
- PDB: IPR004193 PF02922 (ECOD; PDBsum)
- AlphaFold: IPR004193; PF02922

CBM49

Identifiers
- Symbol: CBM49
- Pfam: PF09478
- Pfam clan: CL0203
- InterPro: IPR019028
Available protein structures:
- PDB: IPR019028 PF09478 (ECOD; PDBsum)
- AlphaFold: IPR019028; PF09478

== CBM1 ==
Carbohydrate-binding module family 1 (CBM1) consists of 36 amino acids. This domain contains 4 conserved cysteine residues which are involved in the formation of two disulfide bonds.

== CBM2 ==
Carbohydrate-binding module family 2 (CBM2) contains two conserved cysteines - one at each extremity of the domain - which have been shown to be involved in a disulfide bond. There are also four conserved tryptophans, two of which are involved in cellulose binding.

== CBM3 ==
Carbohydrate-binding module family 3 (CBM3) is involved in cellulose binding and is found associated with a wide range of bacterial glycosyl hydrolases. The structure of this domain is known; it forms a beta sandwich.

== CBM4 ==
Carbohydrate-binding module family 4 (CBM4) includes the two cellulose-binding domains, CBD(N1) and CBD(N2), arranged in tandem at the N terminus of the 1,4-beta-glucanase, CenC, from Cellulomonas fimi. These homologous CBMs are distinct in their selectivity for binding amorphous and not crystalline cellulose. Multidimensional heteronuclear nuclear magnetic resonance (NMR) spectroscopy was used to determine the tertiary structure of the 152 amino acid N-terminal cellulose-binding domain from C. fimi 1,4-beta-glucanase CenC (CBDN1). The tertiary structure of CBDN1 is strikingly similar to that of the bacterial 1,3-1,4-beta-glucanases, as well as other sugar-binding proteins with jelly-roll folds. CBM4 and CBM9 are closely related.

== CBM5 ==
Carbohydrate-binding module family 5 (CBM5) binds chitin. CBM5 and CBM12 are distantly related.

== CBM6 ==
Carbohydrate-binding module family 6 (CBM6) is unusual in that it contains two substrate-binding sites, cleft A and cleft B. Cellvibrio mixtus endoglucanase 5A contains two CBM6 domains, the CBM6 domain at the C-terminus displays distinct ligand binding specificities in each of the substrate-binding clefts. Both cleft A and cleft B can bind cello-oligosaccharides, laminarin preferentially binds in cleft A, xylooligosaccharides only bind in cleft A and beta1,4,-beta1,3-mixed linked glucans only bind in cleft B.

== CBM9 ==
Carbohydrate-binding module family 9 (CBM9) binds to crystalline cellulose. CBM4 and CBM9 are closely related.

== CBM10 ==
Carbohydrate-binding module family 10 (CBM10) is found in two distinct sets of proteins with different functions. Those found in aerobic bacteria bind cellulose (or other carbohydrates); but in anaerobic fungi they are protein binding domains, referred to as dockerin domains. The dockerin domains are believed to be responsible for the assembly of a multiprotein cellulase/hemicellulase complex, similar to the cellulosome found in certain anaerobic bacteria.

In anaerobic bacteria that degrade plant cell walls, exemplified by Clostridium thermocellum, the dockerin domains of the catalytic polypeptides can bind equally well to any cohesin from the same organism. More recently, anaerobic fungi, typified by Piromyces equi, have been suggested to also synthesise a cellulosome complex, although the dockerin sequences of the bacterial and fungal enzymes are completely different. For example, the fungal enzymes contain one, two or three copies of the dockerin sequence in tandem within the catalytic polypeptide. In contrast, all the C. thermocellum cellulosome catalytic components contain a single dockerin domain. The anaerobic bacterial dockerins are homologous to EF hands (calcium-binding motifs) and require calcium for activity whereas the fungal dockerin does not require calcium. Finally, the interaction between cohesin and dockerin appears to be species specific in bacteria, there is almost no species specificity of binding within fungal species and no identified sites that distinguish different species.

The of dockerin from P. equi contains two helical stretches and four short beta-strands which form an antiparallel sheet structure adjacent to an additional short twisted parallel strand. The N- and C-termini are adjacent to each other.

== CBM11 ==
Carbohydrate-binding module family 11 (CBM11) is found in a number of bacterial cellulases. One example is the CBM11 of Clostridium thermocellum Cel26A-Cel5E, this domain has been shown to bind both β-1,4-glucan and β-1,3-1,4-mixed linked glucans. CBM11 has beta-sandwich structure with a concave side forming a substrate-binding cleft.

== CBM12 ==
Carbohydrate-binding module family 12 (CBM12) comprises two beta-sheets, consisting of two and three antiparallel beta strands respectively. It binds chitin via the aromatic rings of tryptophan residues. CBM5 and CBM12 are distantly related.

== CBM14 ==
Carbohydrate-binding module family 14 (CBM14) is also known as the peritrophin-A domain. It is found in chitin binding proteins, particularly the peritrophic matrix proteins of insects and animal chitinases. Copies of the domain are also found in some baculoviruses. It is an extracellular domain that contains six conserved cysteines that probably form three disulfide bridges. Chitin binding has been demonstrated for a protein containing only two of these domains.

== CBM15 ==
Carbohydrate-binding module family 15 (CBM15), found in bacterial enzymes, has been shown to bind to xylan and xylooligosaccharides. It has a beta-jelly roll fold, with a groove on the concave surface of one of the beta-sheets.

== CBM17 ==
Carbohydrate-binding module family 17 (CBM17) appears to have a very shallow binding cleft that may be more accessible to cellulose chains in non-crystalline cellulose than the deeper binding clefts of family 4 CBMs. Sequence and structural conservation in families CBM17 and CBM28 suggests that they have evolved through gene duplication and subsequent divergence. CBM17 does not compete with CBM28 modules when binding to non-crystalline cellulose. Different CBMs have been shown to bind to different sites in amorphous cellulose, CBM17 and CBM28 recognise distinct non-overlapping sites in amorphous cellulose.

== CBM18 ==
Carbohydrate-binding module family 18 (CBM18) (also known as chitin binding 1 or chitin recognition protein) is found in a number of plant and fungal proteins that bind N-acetylglucosamine (e.g. solanaceous lectins of tomato and potato, plant endochitinases, the wound-induced proteins: hevein, win1 and win2, and the Kluyveromyces lactis killer toxin alpha subunit). The domain may occur in one or more copies and is thought to be involved in recognition or binding of chitin subunits. In chitinases, as well as in the potato wound-induced proteins, this 43-residue domain directly follows the signal sequence and is therefore at the N terminus of the mature protein; in the killer toxin alpha subunit it is located in the central section of the protein.

== CBM19 ==
Carbohydrate-binding module family 19 (CBM19), found in fungal chitinases, binds chitin.

== CBM20 ==
Carbohydrate-binding module family 20 (CBM20) binds to starch.

== CBM21 ==
Carbohydrate-binding module family 21 (CBM21), found in many eukaryotic proteins involved in glycogen metabolism, binds to glycogen.

== CBM25 ==
Carbohydrate-binding module family 25 (CBM25) binds alpha-glucooligosaccharides, particularly those containing alpha-1,6 linkages, and granular starch.

== CBM27 ==
Carbohydrate-binding module family 27 (CBM27) binds to beta-1,4-mannooligosaccharides, carob galactomannan, and konjac glucomannan, but not to cellulose (insoluble and soluble) or soluble birchwood xylan. CBM27 adopts a beta sandwich structure comprising 13 beta strands with a single, small alpha-helix and a single metal atom.

== CBM28 ==
Carbohydrate-binding module family 28 (CBM28) does not compete with CBM17 modules when binding to non-crystalline cellulose. Different CBMs have been shown to bind to different sirtes in amorphous cellulose, CBM17 and CBM28 recognise distinct non-overlapping sites in amorphous cellulose. CBM28 has a "beta-jelly roll" topology, which is similar in structure to the CBM17 domains. Sequence and structural conservation in families CBM17 and CBM28 suggests that they have evolved through gene duplication and subsequent divergence.

== CBM32 ==
Carbohydrate-binding module family 32 (CBM32) binds to diverse substrates, ranging from plant cell wall polysaccharides to complex glycans. The module has so far been found in microorganisms, including archea, eubacteria and fungi. CBM32 adopts a beta-sandwich fold and has a bound metal atom, most often observed to be calcium. CBM32 modules are associated with catalytic modules such as sialidases, B-N-acetylglucosaminidases, α-N-acetylglucosaminidases, mannanases and galactose oxidases.

== CBM33 ==
Carbohydrate-binding module family 33 (CBM33) is a chitin-binding domain. It has a budded fibronectin type III fold consisting of two beta-sheets, arranged as a beta-sheet sandwich and a bud consisting of three short helices, located between beta-strands 1 and 2. It binds chitin via conserved polar amino acids. This domain is found in isolation in baculoviral spheroidin and spindolin proteins.

== CBM48 ==
Carbohydrate-binding module family 48 (CBM48) is often found in enzymes containing glycosyl hydrolase family 13 catalytic domains. It is found in a range of enzymes that act on branched substrates i.e. isoamylase, pullulanase and branching enzyme. Isoamylase hydrolyses 1,6-alpha-D-glucosidic branch linkages in glycogen, amylopectin and dextrin; 1,4-alpha-glucan branching enzyme functions in the formation of 1,6-glucosidic linkages of glycogen; and pullulanase is a starch-debranching enzyme. CBM48 binds glycogen.

== CBM49 ==
Carbohydrate-binding module family 49 (CBM49) is found at the C-terminal of cellulases and in vitro binding studies have shown it to binds to crystalline cellulose.
