= Pusillimonas ginsengisoli =

Scientific classification
- Domain: Bacteria
- Kingdom: Bacillati
- Phylum: Bacillota
- Class: Clostridia
- Order: Eubacteriales
- Family: Oscillospiraceae
- Genus: Pusillimonas
- Species: P. ginsengisoli

Binomial name
- Pusillimonas ginsengisoli Srinivasan et al. 2010

Type strain
- DCY25, JCM 14767, KCTC 22046

Species of bacterium

Pusillimonas ginsengisoli is a Gram-negative, oxidase- and catalase-positive, aerobic, non-spore-forming, short rod-shaped, motile bacterium of the genus Pusillimonas, isolated from the soil of a ginseng field in South Korea. Colonies of P. ginsengisoli are pale yellow in color.
