= Pusillimonas =

Scientific classification
- Domain: Bacteria
- Kingdom: Bacillati
- Phylum: Bacillota
- Class: Clostridia
- Order: Eubacteriales
- Family: Oscillospiraceae
- Genus: Pusillimonas; Stolz et al. 2005

Type species
- Pusillimonas noertemannii

Species
- Pusillimonas caeni Jin et al. 2017; Pusillimonas faecipullorum Lin et al. 2022; Pusillimonas ginsengisoli Srinivasa et al. 2010; Pusillimonas harenae Park et al. 2011; Pusillimonas maritima Li et al. 2020; Pusillimonas minor Yaeo et al. 2022; Pusillimonas noertemannii Stolz et al. 2005; Pusillimonas soli Lee et al. 2010; Pusillimonas thiosulfatoxidans Koh et al. 2019

Genus of bacteria

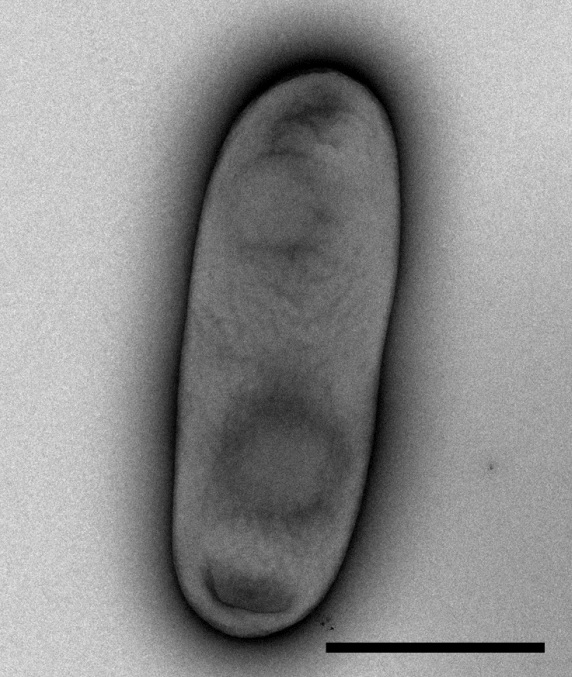
Pusillimonas thiosulfatoxidans

Pusillimonas is a genus of Gram-negative oxidase-positive bacteria of the family Oscillospiraceae. It was formerly included in the family Alcaligenaceae.
