= Thermoclostridium caenicola =

Scientific classification
- Domain: Bacteria
- Kingdom: Bacillati
- Phylum: Bacillota
- Class: Clostridia
- Order: Oscillospirales
- Family: Oscillospiraceae
- Genus: Thermoclostridium
- Species: T. caenicola

Binomial name
- Thermoclostridium caenicola (Shiratori et al. 2009) Zhang et al. 2018

Type strain
- DSM 19027, EBR596, NBRC 102590

Synonyms
- Clostridium caenicola

Species of bacterium

Thermoclostridium caenicola is a Gram-positive anaerobic bacterium from the genus Thermoclostridium which has been isolated from methanogenic sludge.
