= Brotocaccenecus =

Scientific classification
- Domain: Bacteria
- Kingdom: Bacillati
- Phylum: Bacillota
- Class: Clostridia
- Order: Eubacteriales
- Family: Oscillospiraceae
- Genus: Brotocaccenecus Afrizal et al. 2022
- Species: B. cirricatena

Binomial name
- Brotocaccenecus cirricatena Afrizal et al. 2022

Brotocaccenecus cirricatena is an obligately anaerobic, Gram-positive, non-motile species of bacteria found in the human gut microbiome. It is non-spore-forming and cells are rod-shaped. B. cirricatena was first isolated in 2022 from human feces using a single-cell dispensing workflow. It is the only species in the genus Brotocaccenecus.
