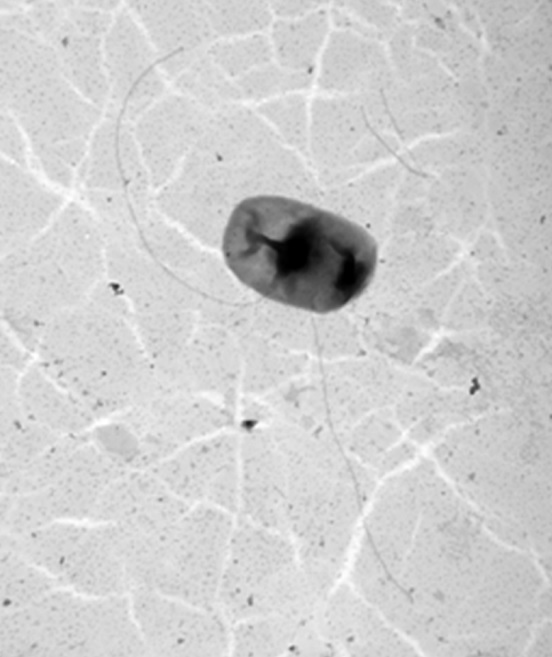
- Pusillimonas harenae

Scientific classification
- Domain: Bacteria
- Kingdom: Bacillati
- Phylum: Bacillota
- Class: Clostridia
- Order: Eubacteriales
- Family: Oscillospiraceae
- Genus: Pusillimonas
- Species: P. harenae

Binomial name
- Pusillimonas harenae Park et al. 2011

Type strain
- B201, JCM 16917, KACC 14927

= Pusillimonas harenae =

Species of bacterium

Pusillimonas harenae is a Gram-negative, oxidase- and catalase-positive, motile bacterium of the genus Pusillimonas, isolated from beach sand on the Taean coast in South Korea.
