= Acetivibrio aldrichii =

Scientific classification
- Domain: Bacteria
- Kingdom: Bacillati
- Phylum: Bacillota
- Class: Clostridia
- Order: Oscillospirales
- Family: Oscillospiraceae
- Genus: Acetivibrio
- Species: A. aldrichii

Binomial name
- Acetivibrio aldrichii (Yang et al. 1990) Tindall 2019

Type strain
- ATCC 49358, DSM 6159, OCM 112, OGI, OGI 112, P-1

Synonyms
- Clostridium aldrichiiYang et al. 1990; Hungateiclostridium aldrichii (Yang et al. 1990) Zhang et al. 2018

Species of bacterium

Acetivibrio aldrichii is a Gram-positive, anaerobic, mesophilic, spore-forming and motile bacterium from the genus Acetivibrio.
