= Hominilimicola =

Scientific classification
- Domain: Bacteria
- Kingdom: Bacillati
- Phylum: Bacillota
- Class: Clostridia
- Order: Eubacteriales
- Family: Oscillospiraceae
- Genus: Hominilimicola; Afrizal et al. 2023
- Species: H. fabiformis

Binomial name
- Hominilimicola fabiformis Afrizal et al. 2023

Genus of bacteria

Hominilimicola fabiformis is a species of obligately anaerobic, Gram-positive, non-motile bacteria found in the human gut microbiome. It is non-spore-forming and cells are bean-shaped. Genetic analysis of the species predicts that it uses glucose and starch and produces acetate, propionate, L-glutamate, folate and cobalamin. H. fabiformis is the only known species in the genus Hominilimicola. The type strain is CLA-AA-H232T (=DSM 113452T).
