= Thermoclostridium stercorarium =

Scientific classification
- Domain: Bacteria
- Kingdom: Bacillati
- Phylum: Bacillota
- Class: Clostridia
- Order: Oscillospirales
- Family: Oscillospiraceae
- Genus: Thermoclostridium
- Species: T. stercorarium

Binomial name
- Thermoclostridium stercorarium (Madden 1983) Zhang et al. 2018

Type strain
- DSM 19027, EBR596, NBRC 102590

Subspecies
- subsp. leptospartum; subsp. stercorarium; subsp. thermolacticum

Synonyms
- Clostridium stercorarium; Clostridium thermolacticum

Species of bacterium

Thermoclostridium stercorarium is a cellulolytic thermophilic bacterium. It is anaerobic, spore-forming and saccharoclastic, with cells being rod-shaped and 0.7 to 0.8 by 2.7 to 7.7 μm in size. Its genome has been sequenced.
