= Gemmiger =

Scientific classification
- Domain: Bacteria
- Kingdom: Bacillati
- Phylum: Bacillota
- Class: Clostridia
- Order: Eubacteriales
- Family: Oscillospiraceae
- Genus: Gemmiger; Gossling and Moore 1975

Type species
- Gemmiger formicilis Gossling and Moore 1975 (Approved Lists 1980)

Species
- See text

Synonyms
- "Ca. Cibionibacter" corrig. Pasolli et al. 2019; Subdoligranulum Holmstrøm et al. 2004

Genus of bacteria

Gemmiger is a genus of bacteria from the family Oscillospiraceae.

== Phylogeny ==
The currently accepted taxonomy is based on the List of Prokaryotic names with Standing in Nomenclature (LPSN) and National Center for Biotechnology Information (NCBI)

16S rRNA based LTP_10_2024

- Gemmiger
  - G. gallinarum
  - - G. formicilis
    - Subdoligranulum variabile

120 marker proteins based GTDB 09-RS220

- Gemmiger
  - - - "Ca. G. faecavium" Gilroy et al. 2021
      - G. gallinarum Zenner et al. 2021
    - - "Ca. G. faecigallinarum" Gilroy et al. 2
      - "Ca. G. stercorigallinarum" Gilroy et al. 2
  - - - "Ca. Cibionibacter qucibialis" corrig. Pasolli et al. 2019
      - - "Ca. G. avicola" Gilroy et al. 2021
        - - "Ca. G. stercoravium" Gilroy et al. 2021
          - "Ca. G. stercoripullorum" Gilroy et al. 2021
    - - G. formicilis Gossling & Moore 1975
      - - - "Ca. G. avistercoris" Gilroy et al. 2021
          - "Ca. G. excrementipullorum" Gilroy et al. 2021
        - - "Ca. G. excrementavium" Gilroy et al. 2021
          - - "Ca. G. excrementigallinarum" Gilroy et al. 2021
            - Subdoligranulum variabile Holmstrøm et al. 2004
