= Acetivibrio alkalicellulosi =

Scientific classification
- Domain: Bacteria
- Kingdom: Bacillati
- Phylum: Bacillota
- Class: Clostridia
- Order: Oscillospirales
- Family: Oscillospiraceae
- Genus: Acetivibrio
- Species: A. alkalicellulosi

Binomial name
- Acetivibrio alkalicellulosi (Zhilina et al. 2006) Tindall 2019

Type strain
- DSM 17461, VKM 2349, VKM B-2349, Z-7026

Synonyms
- Clostridium alkalicellulosi; Clostridium alkalicellum

Species of bacterium

Acetivibrio alkalicellulosi is an obligately alkaliphilic and anaerobic bacterium from the genus Acetivibrio which has been isolated from sediments of the Beloe soda lake from Buryatiya in Russia.
