= Pusillimonas soli =

Scientific classification
- Domain: Bacteria
- Kingdom: Bacillati
- Phylum: Bacillota
- Class: Clostridia
- Order: Eubacteriales
- Family: Oscillospiraceae
- Genus: Pusillimonas
- Species: P. soli

Binomial name
- Pusillimonas soli Lee et al. 2010

Type strain
- JCM 16386, KCTC 22455, MJ07

Species of bacterium

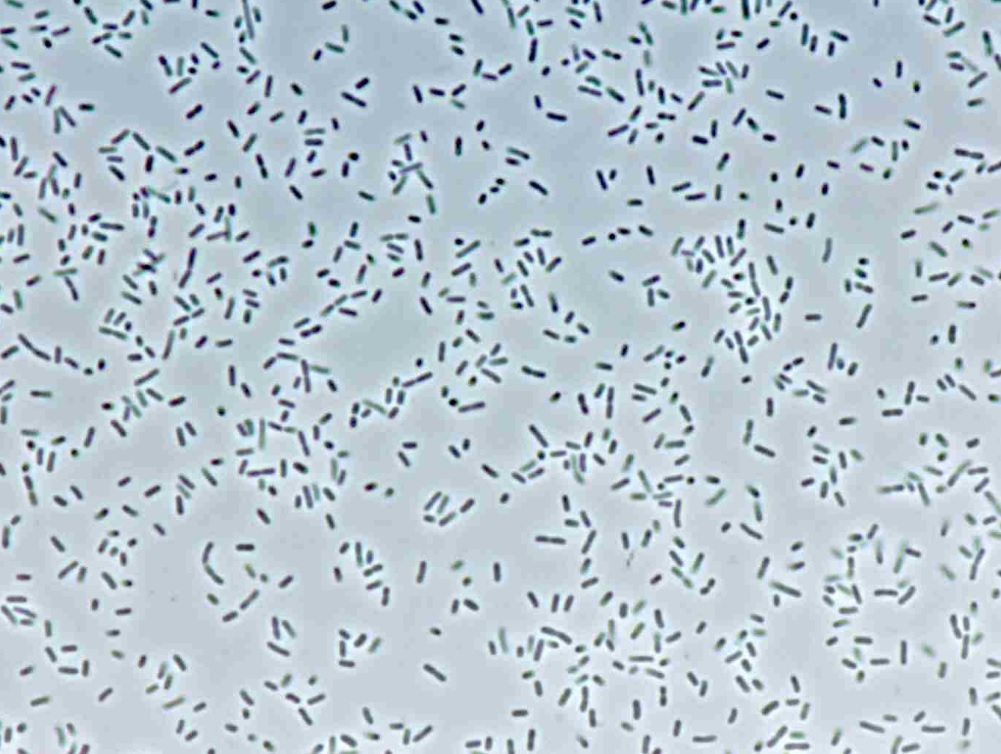
A view of the bacteria under a microscope.

Pusillimonas soli is a Gram-negative, oxidase- and catalase-positive, non-spore-forming, motile bacterium of the genus Pusillimonas, isolated from farm soil near Daejeon in South Korea.
