= Cohesin domain =

Protein domain

Cohesin
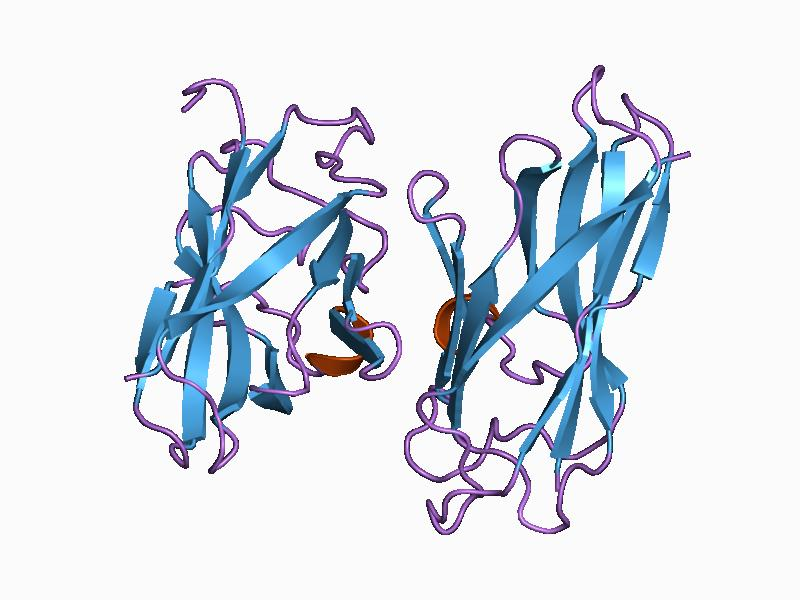
- single cohesin domain from the scaffolding protein cipa of the clostridium thermocellum cellulosome

Identifiers
- Symbol: Cohesin
- Pfam: PF00963
- Pfam clan: CL0203
- InterPro: IPR002102
- SCOP2: 1anu / SCOPe / SUPFAM
- CDD: cd08546
Available protein structures:
- Pfam: structures / ECOD
- PDB: RCSB PDB; PDBe; PDBj
- PDBsum: structure summary

In molecular biology, the cohesin domain is a protein domain. It interacts with a complementary domain, termed the dockerin domain. The cohesin-dockerin interaction is the crucial interaction for complex formation in the cellulosome.

The scaffolding component of the cellulolytic bacterium Clostridium thermocellum is a non-hydrolytic protein which organises the hydrolytic enzymes into a large complex, called the cellulosome. Scaffoldin comprises a series of functional domains, amongst which is a single cellulose-binding domain and nine cohesin domains which are responsible for integrating the individual enzymatic subunits into the complex.
