= Pusillimonas noertemannii =

Scientific classification
- Domain: Bacteria
- Kingdom: Bacillati
- Phylum: Bacillota
- Class: Clostridia
- Order: Eubacteriales
- Family: Oscillospiraceae
- Genus: Pusillimonas
- Species: P. noertemannii

Binomial name
- Pusillimonas noertemannii Stolz et al. 2005

Type strain
- BN9, CCUG 51247, CCUG 51657, CIP 108767, DSM 10065, NCIMB 14020

Species of bacterium

Pusillimonas noertemannii is a Gram-negative, oxidase-positive, rod-shaped, motile bacterium of the genus Pusillimonas; the type strain (BN9T=DSM 10065T=NCIMB 14020T) was isolated from the Elbe in Germany. P. noertemannii has the ability to degrade substituted salicylates.
