= Cellulosibacter =

Scientific classification
- Domain: Bacteria
- Kingdom: Bacillati
- Phylum: Bacillota
- Class: Clostridia
- Order: Oscillospirales
- Family: Oscillospiraceae
- Genus: Cellulosibacter; Watthanalamloet et al. 2012

Type species
- Cellulosibacter alkalithermophilus Watthanalamloet et al. 2012

Species
- C. alkalithermophilus

Genus of bacteria

Cellulosibacter is an obligately anaerobic, cellulolytic and xylanolytic bacterial genus from the family of Clostridiaceae with one known species (Cellulosibacter alkalithermophilus).

== See also ==
- List of bacterial orders
- List of bacteria genera
