= Thermoclostridium =

Scientific classification
- Domain: Bacteria
- Kingdom: Bacillati
- Phylum: Bacillota
- Class: Clostridia
- Order: Oscillospirales
- Family: Oscillospiraceae
- Genus: Thermoclostridium; Zhang et al. 2018

Type species
- Thermoclostridium stercorarium (Madden 1983) Zhang et al. 2018b

Species
- T. caenicola; T. stercorarium

Genus of bacteria

Thermoclostridium is a genus of anaerobic bacteria. Many species in Thermoclostridium were historically ordered in the genus Clostridium.

== See also ==
- List of bacterial orders
- List of bacteria genera
