= Gemmiger formicilis =

Scientific classification
- Domain: Bacteria
- Kingdom: Bacillati
- Phylum: Bacillota
- Class: Clostridia
- Order: Oscillospirales
- Family: Oscillospiraceae
- Genus: Gemmiger
- Species: G. formicilis

Binomial name
- Gemmiger formicilis Gossling and Moore 1975

Type strain X2-56
- ATCC 27749

Species of bacterium

Gemmiger formicilis is a bacterium from the genus Gemmiger. It was initially assigned to the "Pseudomonadota", however 16S rRNA sequencing has led to its reclassification in the Bacillota.
