= Anaerotruncus colihominis =

Scientific classification
- Domain: Bacteria
- Kingdom: Bacillati
- Phylum: Bacillota
- Class: Clostridia
- Order: Eubacteriales
- Family: Oscillospiraceae
- Genus: Anaerotruncus
- Species: A. colihominis

Binomial name
- Anaerotruncus colihominis Lawson et al. 2004

Type strain
- 277, CCUG 45055, CIP 107754, DSM 17241, Finegold 14565, H.Shah, JCM 15631, VTT E-062942, WAL 14565

Species of bacterium

Anaerotruncus colihominis is a Gram-positive, non-spore-forming, rod-shaped and anaerobic bacterium from the genus Anaerotruncus which occur in human faeces. (Please note, however, that the 2006 source, reference 5, describes A. colihominus as Gram-negative and emends the earlier description by observation of occasional spore formation.)
