= Acetivibrio =

Scientific classification
- Domain: Bacteria
- Kingdom: Bacillati
- Phylum: Bacillota
- Class: Clostridia
- Order: Oscillospirales
- Family: Oscillospiraceae
- Genus: Acetivibrio; Patel et al. 1980

Type species
- Acetivibrio cellulolyticus Patel et al. 1980

Species
- See text

Genus of bacteria

Acetivibrio is a genus of Clostridia bacteria.

== Phylogeny ==
The currently accepted taxonomy is based on the List of Prokaryotic names with Standing in Nomenclature (LPSN) and National Center for Biotechnology Information (NCBI)

16S rRNA based LTP_10_2024

- Acetivibrio
  - - A. aldrichii (Yang et al. 1990) Tindall 2019
    - A. cellulolyticus Patel et al. 1980
  - - - A. mesophilus (Rettenmaier et al. 2019) Tindall 2019
      - A. straminisolvens (Kato et al. 2004) Tindall 2019
    - - A. alkalicellulosi (Zhilina et al. 2006) Tindall 2019
      - - A. clariflavus (Shiratori et al. 2009b) Tindall 2019
        - - A. saccincola (Koeck et al. 2016) Tindall 2019
          - A. thermocellus (Viljoen et al. 1926) Tindall 2019

120 marker proteins based GTDB 09-RS220

- - - Acetivibrio
      - A. cellulolyticus
      - A. clariflavus
  - - Herbivorax
      - H. alkalicellulosi
      - H. saccincola
    - Hungateiclostridium
      - H. mesophilum
      - - H. straminisolvens
        - H. thermocellum
