= Hominimerdicola aceti =

Scientific classification
- Domain: Bacteria
- Kingdom: Bacillati
- Phylum: Bacillota
- Class: Clostridia
- Order: Eubacteriales
- Family: Oscillospiraceae
- Genus: Hominimerdicola
- Species: H. aceti

Binomial name
- Hominimerdicola aceti Hitch et al. 2022

Synonyms
- Ruminococcus bicirculans

Hominimerdicola aceti, also Ruminococcus bicirculans, is an anaerobe bacterium that was isolated from the faeces of a healthy human.

Hominimerdicola aceti is unable to utilize cellulose or xylan, so it must rely on the ability of other species to release soluble glucans and degrade plant cell walls.

== Description ==
Hominimerdicola aceti is able to utilize glucose, cellulose, and starch. Pathways for propionate production from propanoyl-CoA have been identified. The bacterium has also been shown to produce acetate.
