= Acetivibrio straminisolvens =

Scientific classification
- Domain: Bacteria
- Kingdom: Bacillati
- Phylum: Bacillota
- Class: Clostridia
- Order: Oscillospirales
- Family: Oscillospiraceae
- Genus: Acetivibrio
- Species: A. straminisolvens

Binomial name
- Acetivibrio straminisolvens (Kato et al. 2004) Tindall 2019

Synonyms
- Clostridium straminisolvens

Species of bacterium

Acetivibrio straminisolvens is a moderately thermophilic, aerotolerant and cellulolytic bacterium. It is non-motile, spore-forming, straight or slightly curved rod, with type strain CSK1^{T} (=DSM 16021^{T} =IAM 15070^{T}). Its genome has been sequenced.
