= Acetivibrio clariflavus =

Scientific classification
- Domain: Bacteria
- Kingdom: Bacillati
- Phylum: Bacillota
- Class: Clostridia
- Order: Eubacteriales
- Family: Oscillospiraceae
- Genus: Acetivibrio
- Species: A. clariflavus

Binomial name
- Acetivibrio clariflavus (Shiratori et al. 2009) Tindall 2019

Type strain
- DSM 19732, EBR-02E-0045, EBR45, NBRC 101661

Synonyms
- Clostridium clariflavum

Species of bacterium

Acetivibrio clariflavus is an anaerobic bacterium from the genus Acetivibrio which has been isolated from sludge from a cellulose-degrading bioreactor in Japan.
