= Dim A B barrel =

Protein structural motif

Dimeric alpha beta barrel domain
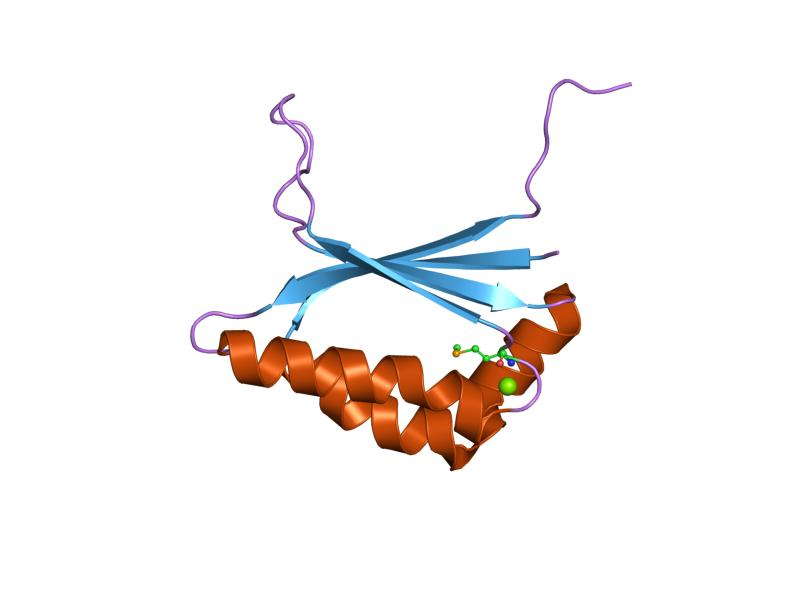
- Cartoon representation of the molecular structure of the Crystal structure of the protein from gene At3g17210 of Arabidopsis thaliana (PDB: 1q4r)

Identifiers
- Symbol: Dim_A_B_barrel
- Pfam clan: CL0032
- ECOD: 304.4
- InterPro: IPR011008
Available protein structures:
- PDB: IPR011008
- AlphaFold: IPR011008

In molecular biology dimeric alpha beta barrel domain (Dim_A_B_barrel) is a protein structural motif found in proteins with a ferredoxin-like fold.

== Structure ==
Pairs of these proteins assemble into a beta barrel structure. Dimeric α-β barrel domains exhibit an α+β sandwich fold with an antiparallel β-sheet that forms a closed barrel. These domains dimerise through the β-sheet, and in some cases these dimers may assemble into higher oligomers.

== Function ==
The function of this barrel is quite varied, indicating versatility in its biological roles.

== Examples ==
Domains with this structure are found in proteins from several different families, including:

- Bacterial actinorhodin biosynthesis monooxygenase (ActVa-Orf6), which catalyses the oxidation of an aromatic intermediate of the actinorhodin biosynthetic pathway
- Bacterial muconalactone isomerase, a decamer composed of five dimers
- The C-terminal domain of archaeal LprA, a member of the Lrp/AqsnC family of transcription regulators
