= Oscillibacter sp ER4 =

Scientific classification
- Domain: Bacteria
- Kingdom: Bacillati
- Phylum: Bacillota
- Class: Clostridia
- Order: Eubacteriales
- Family: Oscillospiraceae
- Genus: Oscillibacter
- Species: O. sp. ER_{4}

Binomial name
- Oscillibacter sp. ER_{4}

Species of bacterium

Oscillibacter sp. ER_{4} is a species of bacteria in the gut microbiome. This specific Oscillibacter species is poorly documented. It has been obtained from human gut isolate.

O. sp. ER_{4} has been linked to improved immunotherapy outcomes: a patients with a high abundance of O. sp. ER_{4} had a prolonged immunotherapy-related overall survival compared to patients with a low abundance. Microbiome and immunotherapy responses are longer. The bacterium is also possibly involved in ageing-related anorexia, although this cannot be confirmed until further research has been conducted.

The bacterium is negatively correlated with triglyceride levels and negatively associated with systolic blood pressure, driven by women. O. sp. ER_{4} has been identified as a species of beneficial bacteria closely associated with the absence of subclinical atherosclerosis; O. sp. ER_{4} is more abundant in healthy control groups than in atherosclerotic patients.

Although linked to improved immunotherapy outcomes, the bacterium seems, interestingly, to have a negative influence on the immunotherapy for colorectal cancer and esophageal squamous cell carcinoma.

A comparison of metagenome-assembled O. sp. ER_{4} genomes revealed a clade enriched in older individuals which was characterised by the depletion of genes related to biotin and amino acid metabolism.

There is an inverse relationship between O. sp. ER_{4} and chronic liver histological damage and the bacterium has been shown to decreased blood and stool cholesterol.
