= Cibionibacter =

Scientific classification (Candidatus)
- Domain: Bacteria
- Kingdom: Bacillati
- Phylum: Bacillota
- Class: Clostridia
- Order: Eubacteriales
- Family: Oscillospiraceae
- Genus: Cibionibacter corrig. Pasolli et al. 2019
- Species: C. quicibialis

Binomial name
- Cibionibacter quicibialis corrig. Pasolli et al. 2019

Species of bacterium

"Candidatus Cibionibacter quicibialis" is a rod-shaped bacteria. It was named after the CIBIO department at the University of Trentro, Italy. It is found and sequenced from the human gut microbiome, but it currently cannot be cultured in a laboratory (which is why it is given candidatus name). C. quicibialis maybe involved with vitamin B12 synthesis

Cibionibacter quicibialis has been found in multiple studies involved humans. A 2026 study found C. quicibialis to be one of the species that was unique to the Saudi population they sampled when comparing other metagenomic sequencing data across 37 countries, highlighting changes in gut microbiome due to region.
