= Oscillibacter valericigenes =

Scientific classification
- Domain: Bacteria
- Kingdom: Bacillati
- Phylum: Bacillota
- Class: Clostridia
- Order: Eubacteriales
- Family: Oscillospiraceae
- Genus: Oscillibacter
- Species: O. valericigenes

Binomial name
- Oscillibacter valericigenes Iino et al. 2007

Species of bacterium

Oscillibacter valericigenes is a species of mesophilic bacteria identified in the alimentary canal of Japanese Corbicula clams. It is Gram-negative and anaerobic, with a straight to slightly curved rod-like morphology, and is motile with peritrichous flagella (i.e., flagella with diverse orientations from the cell body). It was not observed in culture to form spores.

== Phylogenetic relationships ==
Based on sequencing of 16S rRNA, O. valericigenes is a member of the clostridial cluster IV, a subgroup of clostridial bacteria typically found in the alimentary canals of animals, including humans. Its closest cultured relatives at the time of its original description in 2007 were Clostridium orbiscindens (found in human feces) and Clostridium viride. It also exhibits a close relationship to Oscillospira guillermondii, a large bacterial species found in the guts of ruminant animals, which has yet to be grown in culture despite having been first observed in 1913.

Oscillibacter valericigenes is unusual in that its 16S rRNA more closely resembles that of uncultured bacteria in animal digestive tracts than the other cultured members of clostridial cluster IV. Its genome was sequenced in 2012 and found to contain some genes identifiably homologous to those known to be involved in sporulation; however, it is missing many genes involved in the later stages of sporulation that are widely distributed among clostridial bacteria.

== Metabolism ==
Oscillibacter valericigenes grows fermentatively, producing predominantly valerate when grown on a glucose carbon source. The bacteria were observed to grow in culture using D-glucose, L-arabinose, D-ribose, and D-xylose as carbon sources.

== Clinical significance ==
Oscillibacter valericigenes has been detected in the human intestinal microbiome. In one study of human gut microflora, O. valericigenes was found in significantly more samples from healthy control test subjects than from patients diagnosed with Crohn's disease.
