= Carbohydrate-binding module =

Protein domain found in carbohydrate-active enzymes

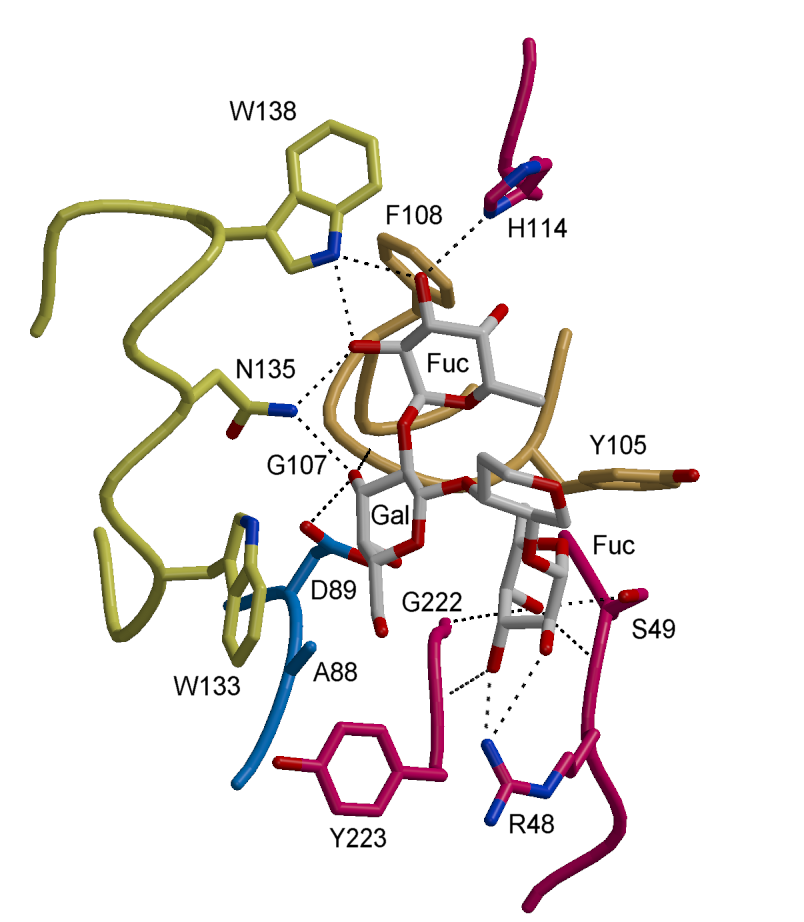
An oligosaccharide (Lewis b antigen, partial structure present, shown in grey) bound to the carbohydrate-binding module of a lectin (isolectin GS-IB4) from the plant Griffonia simplicifolia. The binding domain is marked by the dashined lines connecting segments of the protein structure to segments of the carbohydrates.

A carbohydrate-binding module (CBM), also known as a carbohydrate recognition domain (CRD), is a protein domain found in carbohydrate-interacting enzymes, for example glycoside hydrolases, galectins, or xylanases.

CBMs were first documented in the scaffoldin proteins of cellulosomes, and thus were previously known as cellulose-binding domains before a much broader range of protein-carbohydrate interactions entered the scientific literature. CBMs are classified into numerous families, based on amino acid sequence similarity. As of 2024, there are 103 families of CBM in the CAZy enzyme database.

In the field of protein structural phylogenetics, protein evolution is studied through structural analysis of binding domains, in particular CBMs, to create phylogenetic trees of protein structure, rather than purely of amino acid sequence.

== In protein-cellulose interactions ==
CBMs of microbial glycoside hydrolases play a central role in the recycling of photosynthetically fixed carbon through their binding to specific plant structural polysaccharides. CBMs can recognise both crystalline and amorphous cellulose forms. CBMs are the most common non-catalytic modules associated with enzymes active in plant cell-wall hydrolysis. Many putative CBMs have been identified by amino acid sequence alignments but only a few representatives have been shown experimentally to have a carbohydrate-binding function.
