= Acetivibrio thermocellus =

Scientific classification
- Domain: Bacteria
- Kingdom: Bacillati
- Phylum: Bacillota
- Class: Clostridia
- Order: Oscillospirales
- Family: Oscillospiraceae
- Genus: Acetivibrio
- Species: A. thermocellus

Binomial name
- Acetivibrio thermocellus (Viljoen et al. 1926) Tindall 2019

Synonyms
- Clostridium thermocellum

Species of bacterium

Acetivibrio thermocellus is an anaerobic, thermophilic bacterium. A. thermocellus has garnered research interest due to its cellulolytic and ethanologenic abilities, being capable of directly converting a cellulosic substrate into ethanol by consolidated bioprocessing. This makes it useful in converting biomass into a usable energy source. The degradation of the cellulose is carried out in the bacterium by a large extracellular cellulase system called a cellulosome, which contains nearly 20 catalytic subunits. The cellulase system of the bacterium significantly differs from fungal cellulases due to its high activity on crystalline cellulose, being able to completely solubilize crystalline sources of cellulose, such as cotton. However, there are some shortfalls in applying the organism to practical applications due to it having low ethanol yield, at least partially due to branched fermentation pathways that produce acetate, formate, and lactate along with ethanol. There is also evidence of inhibition due to the presence of hydrogen and due to agitation. Some recent research has been directed to optimizing the ethanol-producing metabolic pathway in hopes of creating more efficient biomass conversion.
