= Oscillibacter =

Scientific classification
- Domain: Bacteria
- Kingdom: Bacillati
- Phylum: Bacillota
- Class: Clostridia
- Order: Eubacteriales
- Family: Oscillospiraceae
- Genus: Oscillibacter; Iino et al. 2007

Type species
- Oscillibacter valericigenes Iino et al. 2007

Species
- O. acetigenes; O. hominis; O. ruminantium; O. valericigenes; O. sp ER_{4}

Genus of anaerobic bacteria

Oscillibacter is a genus of strictly anaerobic, Gram-stain-negative, non-spore-forming, rod-shaped bacteria in the family Oscillospiraceae. The type species is Oscillibacter valericigenes. Four species have validly published and correct names and a fifth has been provisionally described.

== Description and ecology ==
Members of Oscillibacter are fermentative bacteria associated with animal digestive tracts. The type strain of O. valericigenes was isolated from the alimentary canal of a Japanese corbicula clam. Its cells are straight to slightly curved rods, are motile by means of peritrichous flagella, and produce valerate as a major fermentation product from glucose.

Oscillibacter ruminantium was originally isolated from the rumen of cattle. It is also motile by peritrichous flagella and produces butyrate as its major fermentation product under the tested conditions. The type strain of O. acetigenes was isolated from human feces.

== Taxonomy ==
The name Oscillibacter combines the Latin word oscillum, meaning a swing, with bacter, meaning a rod, and refers to the oscillating movement of cells of the type species. The genus was described in 2007, and an emended description was published in 2020.

== Phylogeny ==
The phylogenomic tree below is a pruned extract from the bacterial species tree of GTDB release R11-RS232. The GTDB bacterial tree is based on a concatenated alignment of 120 single-copy marker proteins.

The lettered suffixes distinguish additional GTDB species clusters and do not represent separately validly published species names. O. acetigenes is not represented under its current name in the R11-RS232 species-label tree.

120 marker protein-based phylogeny (GTDB R11-RS232)

- Oscillibacter
  - - - O. valericigenes_A (GTDB cluster)
      - O. valericigenes_B (GTDB cluster)
    - - O. valericigenes
      - O. ruminantium
  - O. hominis

== See also ==
- List of bacteria genera
