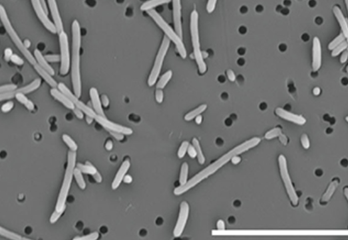

Scientific classification
- Domain: Bacteria
- Kingdom: Bacillati
- Phylum: Bacillota
- Class: Clostridia
- Order: Eubacteriales
- Family: Oscillospiraceae
- Genus: Flavonifractor
- Species: F. plautii

Binomial name
- Flavonifractor plautii (Séguin 1928) Carlier et al. 2010

Synonyms
- Clostridium orbiscindens Winter et al. 1991; Eubacterium plautii (Séguin 1928) Hofstad and Aasjord 1982; Fusobacterium plauti; Fusobacterium plautii Séguin 1928

= Flavonifractor plautii =

Species of bacterium

Flavonifractor plautii is a bacterium of the monotypic genus Flavonifractor in the family Oscillospiraceae.

== History ==
This species was originally placed in the genus Fusobacterium by S. Seguin in 1928, and was later recategorized as Fusocillus in 1938 by A.R. Prevot. This classification remained until 1962, when M. Sebald renamed the species Zuberella plauti. In 1928, Skerman VBD and colleagues referred to this species as Fusobacterium plauti in the “Approved Lists of Bacterial Names”. In 1982, Hofstad and Aasjord officially assigned the name Eubacterium plautii to this species. In 1991, Winter et al. highlighted the bacterium’s ability to cleave flavonoids and introduced its basionym as Clostridium orbiscindens. Finally, in 2010, Carlier et al. proposed the unification of Clostridium orbiscindens and Eubacterium plautii under the new name Flavonifractor plautii. The cells are described as straight or slightly curved rods, 2–10 microns long, occurring singly or in pairs. Strains have been isolated from human feces, blood, intra-abdominal pus, and infected soft tissues.

== Genome ==
Flavonifractor plautii has a genome consisting of a single circular chromosome with 3,985,392 base pairs, with a G+C content of 60.9%. The genome is predicted to contain 3 complete sets of rRNA genes, 63 tRNA genes, and 3,764 protein-coding sequences.

== Metabolism and ecology ==
This bacterium is an obligate anaerobe that is capable of cleaving the C-ring found in flavonoids. Flavonifractor plautii is highly prevalent in the human gastrointestinal tract, and is known to be a proficient producer of butyrate.

== Clinical significance ==
Flavonifractor plautii was found to be associated with colorectal cancer (CRC) in a cohort of 30 CRC patients and 30 healthy controls. It was hypothesized that the degradation of beneficial anticarcinogenic flavonoids, such as quercetin, by F. plautii may contribute to the cancer. Flavonifractor plautii was also found to be significantly enriched in major depressive disorder (MDD) in a cohort of 90 American young adults (43 with MDD, 47 healthy).

In pediatric inflammatory bowel disease, F. plautii was shown to preferentially bind immunoglobulin G (IgG) from Crohn’s disease patients compared to non-inflammatory bowel disease and ulcerative colitis samples. It also demonstrated invasive potential in vitro using a fluorescence microscopy assay with intestinal epithelial cells in culture.
