= Anaerotruncus =

Scientific classification
- Domain: Bacteria
- Kingdom: Bacillati
- Phylum: Bacillota
- Class: Clostridia
- Order: Eubacteriales
- Family: Oscillospiraceae
- Genus: Anaerotruncus; Lawson et al. 2004

Type species
- Anaerotruncus colihominis Lawson et al. 2004

Species
- A. colihominis; "Ca. A. excrementipullorum"; " A. massiliensis"; " A. rubiinfantis"

Genus of bacteria

Anaerotruncus is a bacterial genus from the family of Oscillospiraceae, with one known species (Anaerotruncus colihominis). Anaerotruncus bacteria occur in the human vaginal flora and gut.

== Phylogeny ==
The currently accepted taxonomy is based on the List of Prokaryotic names with Standing in Nomenclature (LPSN) and National Center for Biotechnology Information (NCBI)

16S rRNA based LTP_10_2024

- Anaerotruncus
  A. colihominis

120 marker proteins based GTDB 09-RS220

- Anaerotruncus
  - " A. rubiinfantis" Pham et al. 2017
  - - "Ca. A. excrementipullorum" Gilroy et al. 2021
    - - A. colihominis Lawson et al. 2004
      - " A. massiliensis" Togo et al. 2016
