= Paludicola psychrotolerans =

Scientific classification
- Domain: Bacteria
- Kingdom: Bacillati
- Phylum: Bacillota
- Class: Clostridia
- Order: Oscillospirales
- Family: Oscillospiraceae
- Genus: Paludicola
- Species: P. psychrotolerans

Binomial name
- Paludicola psychrotolerans Li et al. 2017

Species of bacterium

Paludicola psychrotolerans is a bacterium of the monotypic genus Paludicola in the family Oscillospiraceae.
