= Acetanaerobacterium =

Scientific classification
- Domain: Bacteria
- Kingdom: Bacillati
- Phylum: Bacillota
- Class: Clostridia
- Order: Oscillospirales
- Family: Oscillospiraceae
- Genus: Acetanaerobacterium; Chen and Dong 2004

Type species
- Acetanaerobacterium elongatum Chen and Dong 2004

Species
- A. elongatum

Genus of bacteria

Acetanaerobacterium is a genus in the phylum Bacillota (Bacteria). The genus contains a single species, A. elongatum ( Chen and Dong 2004, sp. nov.).

== See also ==
- Bacterial taxonomy
- List of bacterial orders
- List of bacteria genera
- Microbiology
