= Acutalibacter =

Scientific classification
- Domain: Bacteria
- Kingdom: Bacillati
- Phylum: Bacillota
- Class: Clostridia
- Order: Eubacteriales
- Family: Oscillospiraceae
- Genus: Acutalibacter; Lagkouvardos et al. 2016

Type species
- Acutalibacter muris Lagkouvardos et al. 2016

Species
- A. caecimuris; A. intestini; A. muris; "Ca. A. ornithocaccae"; "Ca. A. pullicola"; "Ca. A. pullistercoris"; "Ca. A. stercoravium"; "Ca. A. stercorigallinarum"

Genus of bacteria

Acutalibacter is a genus of bacteria from the family of Oscillospiraceae. Acutalibacter muris has been isolated from the feces of a mouse from Munich in Germany.

== Phylogeny ==
The currently accepted taxonomy is based on the List of Prokaryotic names with Standing in Nomenclature (LPSN) and National Center for Biotechnology Information (NCBI)

16S rRNA based LTP_10_2024

- Acutalibacter
  A. muris

120 marker proteins based GTDB 09-RS220

- Acutalibacter
  - "Ca. Clostridium timonensis" Fenollar et al. 2006
  - - A. muris Lagkouvardos et al. 2016
    - - - "Ca. A. pullistercoris" Gilroy et al. 2021
        - "Ca. A. stercorigallinarum" Gilroy et al. 2021
      - - "Ca. A. pullicola" Gilroy et al. 2021
        - - "Ca. A. ornithocaccae" Gilroy et al. 2021
          - "Ca. A. stercoravium" Gilroy et al. 2021
