= Dockerin =

Dockerin domain
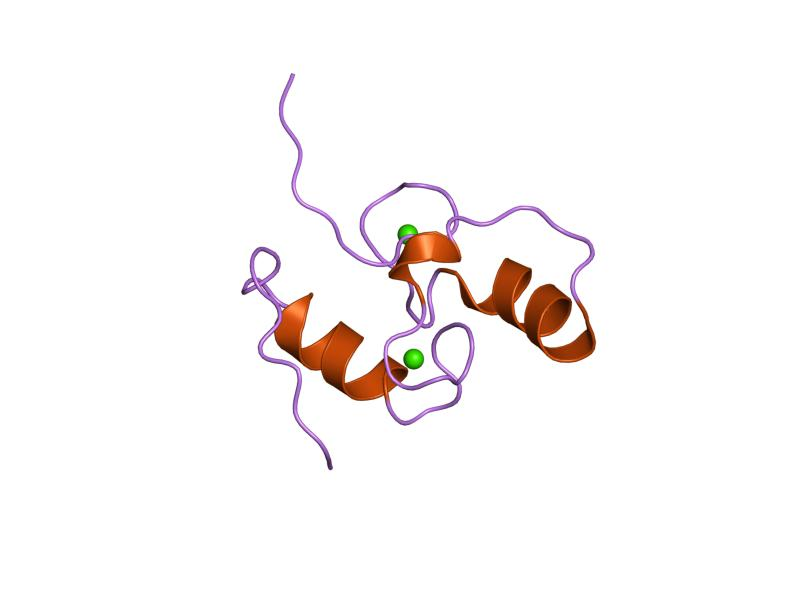
- Structure of the Dockerin type I domain from C. thermocellum cellulosome.

Identifiers
- Symbol: Dockerin_1
- Pfam: PF00404
- InterPro: IPR018242
- PROSITE: PDOC00416
- SCOP2: 1daq / SCOPe / SUPFAM
- CDD: cd14253
Available protein structures:
- Pfam: structures / ECOD
- PDB: RCSB PDB; PDBe; PDBj
- PDBsum: structure summary

Dockerin is a protein domain found in the cellulosome cellular structure of anaerobic bacteria. It is found on many endoglucanase enzymes. The dockerin's binding partner is the cohesin domain, located on the scaffoldin protein. This interaction between the dockerin domains of the enzyme constituents of the cellulosome and the cohesin domains of the scaffoldin protein is essential to the construction of the cellulosome complex. The Dockerin domain has two in-tandem repeats of a non-EF hand calcium binding motif. Each motif is characterized by a loop-helix structure. The three-dimensional structure of dockerin has been determined in solution, as well as in complex with Cohesin.

There are three types of Dockerin domains: I, II and III which bind to Cohesin Type I, Cohesin Type II and Cohesin Type III respectively. A type I dockerin domain is 65-70 residues long. The binding specificity of Type I interaction was well studied by structural and mutagenesis studies. Type II interaction is less well characterized.

== See also ==
- EF hand
- cellulosome
