= Cellulosome =

Multi-enzyme complex for cellulose degradation

Cellulosomes are intricate, multi-enzyme machines produced by many cellulolytic microorganisms for efficient degradation of plant cell wall polysaccharides, notably cellulose, the most abundant organic polymer on Earth. Cellulosomes are associated with the cell surface and mediate cell attachment to insoluble substrates and degrade them to soluble products which are then absorbed. The multiple subunits of cellulosomes are composed of numerous functional domains that interact with each other and with the cellulosic substrate. One of these subunits, a large glycoprotein "scaffoldin", is a distinctive class of non-catalytic scaffolding polypeptides. The scaffoldin subunit selectively integrates the various cellulases and xylanase subunits into the cohesive complex, by combining its cohesin domains with a typical dockerin domain present on each of the subunit enzymes. The scaffoldin of some cellulosomes, an example being that of Clostridium thermocellum, contains a carbohydrate-binding module that adheres cellulose to the cellulosomal complex.

== Structure ==
Cellulosomes exist as extracellular complexes that are either attached to the cell wall of bacteria or free in solution, where the insoluble substrate can be broken down into soluble products and taken up by the cell. The large size and heterogeneity of cellulosomes from the best-characterized organisms (i.e., C. thermocellum, C. cellulolyticum, and C. cellulovorans) have greatly complicated efforts to probe cellulosome structure and function. Other cellulosome systems (such as those from Acetivibrio cellulolyticus and Ruminococcus flavefaciens) appear to be even more intricate.

The cellulosome consists of a multi-functional, integrating scaffoldin subunit, responsible for organizing the various cellulolytic subunits (e.g., the enzymes) into the complex. Within a cellulosome, multiple endoglucanases, cellobiohydrolases, xylanases and other degradative enzymes work synergistically to attack heterogeneous, insoluble cellulose substrates. This is accomplished by the interaction of two complementary classes of module, located on the two separate types of interacting subunits, i.e., a cohesin module on the scaffoldin and a dockerin module on each enzymatic subunit. The high-affinity cohesin-dockerin interaction defines the cellulosome structure. Attachment of the cellulosome to its substrate is mediated by a scaffoldin-borne cellulose-binding module (CBM) that comprises part of the scaffoldin subunit. Much of our understanding of its catalytic components, architecture, and mechanisms of attachment to the bacterial cell and to cellulose, has been derived from the study of Clostridium thermocellum.

== History of discovery ==
In the early 1980s, Raphael Lamed and Ed Bayer met at Tel Aviv University, Israel and commenced their work that led to the discovery of the cellulosome concept. At the time, they weren’t looking for enzymes or cellulosomes at all. They simply sought a ‘cellulose-binding factor’ or ‘CBF’ on the cell surface of the anaerobic thermophilic bacterium, C. thermocellum, which they inferred would account for the observation that the bacterium attaches strongly to the insoluble cellulose substrate prior to its degradation. They employed a then unconventional experimental approach, in which they isolated an adherence-defective mutant of the bacterium and prepared a specific polyclonal antibody for detection of the functional component. Surprisingly, they isolated a very large multi-sub-unit supra-molecular complex, instead of a small protein. A combination of biochemical, biophysical, immun-ochemical and ultra-structural techniques, followed by molecular biological verification, led to the definition and proof of the cellulosome concept. The birth of the discrete, multi-enzyme cellulosome complex was thus documented.

Currently known cellulosome-producing anaerobic bacteria:

- Acetivibrio cellulolyticus
- Bacteroides cellulosolvens
- Clostridium acetobutylicum
- Clostridium cellulolyticum
- Clostridium cellulovorans
- Clostridium clariflavum
- Clostridium josui
- Clostridium papyrosolvens
- Clostridium thermocellum (treated as model organism in cellulose utilization and also anaerobic degradation)
- Ruminococcus albus (dockerins identified, cohesins as yet undetected)
- Ruminococcus flavefaciens

== Application ==
Specific application of cellulosome hybrids and chimeric constructs ("nanosomes") of cellulosomal domains should enable better use of cellulosic biomass and may offer a wide range of novel applications.

== See also ==
- Dockerin
- Organelle
