= Evolutionary Classification of Protein Domains =

ECOD
Content
- Data types captured: Protein domains

Contact
- Research center: Grishin Lab, University of Texas Southwestern Medical Center
- Authors: H. Cheng, R. D. Schaeffer, Y. Liao, L. N. Kinch, J. Pei, S. Shi, B. H. Kim, N. V. Grishin.
- Primary citation: PMID 25474468
- Release date: 2014

Access
- Website: http://prodata.swmed.edu/ecod/

Miscellaneous
- Version: continuously updated
- Curation policy: manual for new proteins; automated for ones with close matches

The Evolutionary Classification of Protein Domains (ECOD) is a biological database that classifies protein domains available from the Protein Data Bank. The ECOD tries to determine the evolutionary relationships between proteins.

Similar to Pfam, CATH, and SCOP, ECOD compiles domains instead of whole proteins. However, ECOD focuses on evolutionary relationships more heavily: instead of grouping proteins by folds, which may simply represent convergent evolution, ECOD groups proteins by demonstratable homology and then by detailed topology and protein families

The database uses a five-level hierarchy to categorize protein domains from broad shapes down to specific families:

- (A) Architecture: The highest level, grouping domains by similar secondary structure compositions and geometric arrangements (e.g., alpha bundles or beta sandwiches).
- (X) Possible Homology: Clusters domains that share structural similarity where homology is suspected but not yet definitively proven.
- (H) Homology: The core level of the database, grouping domains with strong evidence of common ancestry based on sequence-structure scores and functional similarity.
- (T) Topology: Groups domains with similar topological connections. This level recognizes that homologous proteins can sometimes evolve different folds.
- (F) Family: The most specific level, grouping domains with significant sequence similarity, often based on Pfam classifications.

ECOD has been applied to a subset of the AlphaFold Database (protein sequences in SwissProt).
