= Protein–carbohydrate interaction =

Intermolecular and intramolecular interactions between protein and carbohydrate moieties

Carbohydrate–protein interactions are the intermolecular and intramolecular interactions between protein and carbohydrate moieties. These interactions form the basis of specific recognition of carbohydrates by lectins. Carbohydrates are important biopolymers and have a variety of functions. Often carbohydrates serve a function as a recognition element. That is, they are specifically recognized by other biomolecules. Proteins which bind carbohydrate structures are known as lectins. Compared to the study of protein–protein and protein–DNA interaction, it is relatively recent that scientists get to know the protein–carbohydrate binding.

Many of these interactions involved carbohydrates found at the cell surface, as part of a membrane glycoprotein or glycolipid. These interactions can play a role in cellular adhesion and other cellular recognition events. Intramolecular carbohydrate–protein interactions refer to interactions between glycan and polypeptide moieties in glycoproteins or the glycosylated proteins.

== Classification ==
Generally, there are two types of protein carbohydrate binding important in biological processes: Lectin and antibody.

=== Lectin ===
Lectin is a kind of protein that can bind to carbohydrate with their carbohydrate recognition domains (CRDs). We could use different CRD to classify them.

==== C-type ====
Ca^{2+} is required to activate the binding. Ca^{2+} binds to the protein and carbohydrate by non covalent bond. Mannose-binding protein (MBP) contains the C-type CRD.

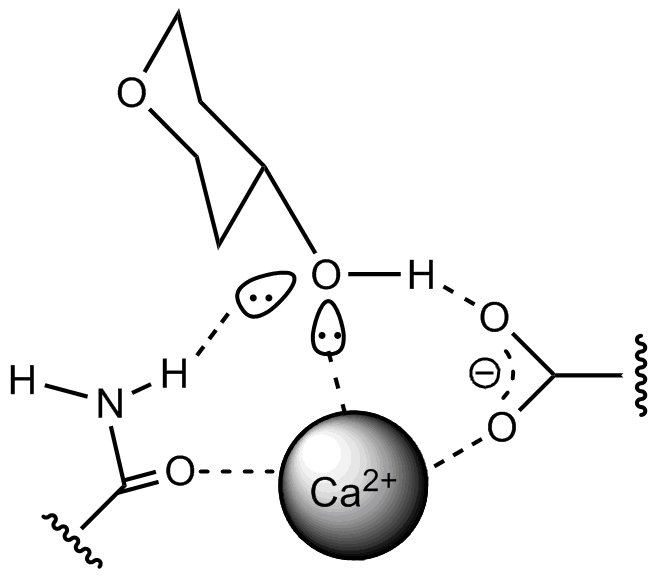

==== P-type ====
Two types mannose-6-phosphate can recognize phosphorylated saccharide. One is cation-dependent and the other does not require cation to activate.

==== I-type ====
I-type lectin named from the immunoglobulin-like domain. Sialoadhesin is one of the I-type lectin, which binds specifically to sialic acid.

=== Antibody ===
Most antibodies have the similar structure except the hypervariable region which is called the antigen binding site. This region is constituted by the combination of various amino acids. When the antigen is a kind of carbohydrate (Polysaccharide), the binding could be regarded as a protein-carbohydrate interaction.

== Biological function ==
Protein–carbohydrate interactions play an important role in biological function.

- Cell adhesion
- Signal Transduction
- Host-Pathogen Recognition
- Inflammation
- Stabilization of protein structure

== Methods of study ==
- X-ray crystallography

As in other studies of organic molecules, X-ray crystallography is a very useful tool to obtain the detailed information on the interaction between carbohydrates and proteins.

- NMR Study

By using titration, NOESY(Nuclear Overhauser Effect SpectroscopY), CIDNP experiments, the specificity and affinity of binding, association constants and equilibrium thermodynamic parameters of carbohydrate–protein binding can be studied.

- Molecular Modeling

In many cases, the conformation information is required, however, sometimes it is not able to get directly from the experiments. So the knowledge-based model building approach is used.

- Fluorescence Spectrometry

Fluorescence spectrometry is a tool that requires no procedure for separation. There are also plenty of ways to get fluorophore sources: there are some amino acids and ligands that become fluorophores after they are activated.

- Dual polarisation interferometry

Dual polarisation interferometry is a label free analytical technique for measuring interactions and associated conformational changes.

== Advances in the study of protein–carbohydrate binding ==
- Microarray-Based Study by Metal Nanoparticle Probes

Recently, studies by using metal nanoparticle probes to detect the carbohydrate–protein interactions were reported. Use of gold and silver nanoparticle probes in resonant light scattering (RLS) gives particular high sensitivity. Zhenxin Wang and coworker the same principle applied this method to detect the interaction between carbohydrate and protein.

- Carbohydrate biosensor

As Lectin can strongly bind to specific carbohydrate, scientists develop several lectin-based carbohydrate biosensors. Designed lectin contains specific groups can be detected by analytical method.

- Isothermal Titration Calorimetry
