= Oscillospiraceae =

Scientific classification
- Domain: Bacteria
- Kingdom: Bacillati
- Phylum: Bacillota
- Class: Clostridia
- Order: Eubacteriales
- Family: Oscillospiraceae; Peshkoff 1940 (Approved Lists 1980)

Genera
- See text

Family of bacteria

Oscillospiraceae, also commonly called Ruminococcaceae, is a family of bacteria in the class Clostridia. All Oscillospiraceae are obligate anaerobes. However, members of the family have diverse shapes, with some rod-shaped and others cocci.

Within the family, Faecalibacterium prausnitzii is notable as an abundant commensal bacteria of the human gut microbiota. In addition, several members of Ruminococcus are found in the human gut. The Oscillospira genus and its impact on human health has led to numerous theories on its development and its involvement in human health.

== Current knowledge ==
The first species of the Oscillospira genus, a bacterium named O. guillermondii, was found in 1913 in the cecal contents of a guinea pig by Chatton and Pérard and is the only formally described species in the genus. Knowledge of Oscillospira and their physiology and ecological interactions are still minimal having limited success in cultivation. The necessary components for Oscillospira to grow are still undetermined or otherwise unknown. A characteristic of this bacterium is the ability to form spores and take on different physical shapes like rods and cocci. The Oscillospira species are assumed to be slower growers as they are more abundantly found in harder or firmer stools, an indicator of spending more time in the colon before being passed, commonly known as constipation. This theory is further supported by their ties to gallstone disease where constipation is a risk factor.

== Impact on gut health ==
Members of this family are observed to be abundantly found in fecal microbiota. Oscillospira in particular has been found to have possible ties to leanness through its 16s rRNA gene in recent gut microbiota studies and has established a connection with a lack of abundance of these bacteria in people impacted with steatohepatitis, a liver disease, and inflammatory bowel diseases such as Chron's and Ulcerative colitis.In addition, Oscillospira have been shown to ferment complex plant carbohydrates and is being looked at to play a potential role in probiotic production. Oscillospira has also been found in animals such as cattle and sheep and similarly to humans, the abundance and form of Oscillospira is largely dependent on diet. Greater abundance was found to be with primarily fresh forage food in these animals.

== Phylogeny ==
The currently accepted taxonomy is based on the List of Prokaryotic names with Standing in Nomenclature (LPSN) and National Center for Biotechnology Information (NCBI)

16S rRNA based LTP_10_2024

- Oscillospiraceae
  - Sporobacter
  - - - Vescimonas
      - - Hominicoprocola
        - - Oscillibacter
          - Dysosmobacter
    - - Intestinimonas
      - - Clostridium viride Buckel et al. 1995
        - - - Flintibacter butyricus Lagkouvardos et al. 2016
            - Muriventricola
          - - Pseudoflavonifractor
            - - Intestinimonas
              - - Flavonifractor
                - Lawsonibacter

120 marker proteins based GTDB 09-RS220

- Oscillospiraceae
  - 1
    - - "Ca. Alloscillospira" Glendinning et al. 2020
      - Sporobacter Grech-Mora et al. 1996
    - - "Ca. Heteroscillospira" corrig. Glendinning et al. 2020
      - - "Ca. Limivicinus" faecipullorum" Gilroy et al. 2021
        - "Ca. Scatomorpha" Gilroy et al. 2021
  - - - "Ca. Avoscillospira" Gilroy et al. 2021
      - "Ca. Faecousia" Gilroy et al. 2021 non Hitch et al. 2024
    - - Papillibacter Defnoun et al. 2000
      - - - "Ca. Pseudoscillospira" corrig. Glendinning et al. 2020
          - - "Ca. Pelethomonas" Gilroy et al. 2021
            - - - Hominicoprocola Afrizal et al. 2023
                - Vescimonas Kitahara et al. 2021
              - - Dysosmobacter species-group 2
                - - Oscillibacter Iino et al. 2007
                  - Dysosmobacter Le Roy et al. 2020
        - - "Ca. Onthomonas" Gilroy et al. 2021
          - - "Evtepia" Strandwitz et al. 2019
            - - Lawsonibacter Sakamoto et al. 2018 [Flintibacter Lagkouvardos et al. 2016; Muriventricola Hitch et al. 2022]
              - - "Ca. Enterenecus" Gilroy et al. 2021
                - - Intestinimonas Kläring et al. 2013
                  - - "Vermiculatibacterium" Afrizal et al. 2022
                    - - Pseudoflavonifractor species-group 2
                      - - - "Ca. Galloscillospira" species-group 2
                          - Pseudoflavonifractor Carlier et al. 2010
                        - - Lawsonibacter celer Liu et al. 2022
                          - - Lawsonibacter hominis Liu et al. 2022
                            - Flavonifractor Carlier et al. 2010

Unassigned genera:

- Amygdalobacter Srinivasan et al. 2023
- "Ca. Apopatocola" Gilroy et al. 2022
- Bengtsoniella Pardesi et al. 2024
- Drancourtella Durand et al. 2023
- "Ca. Faecousia" Hitch et al. 2024 non Gilroy et al. 2021
- Flintibacter corrig. Lagkouvardos et al. 2016
- "Hominicola" Hitch et al. 2024
- "Ca. Intestinicoccus" Zhou et al. 2023
- "Jilunia" Liu et al. 2021b
- "Jirenia" Huang et al. 2024
- "Marasmitruncus" Pham et al. 2017
- "Markus" Huang et al. 2024 non Fanti & Pankowski 2018
- "Mengyingia" Huang et al. 2024
- Neglectibacter Zgheib et al. 2024
- "Neopoerus" Selma-Royo et al. 2023
- Oscillospira corrig. Chatton & Pérard 1913
- Owariibacterium Hamaguchi et al. 2025
- Paludihabitans Deshmukh & Oren 2023 [Paludicola Li et al. 2017 non Blasius 1857 non Hodgson 1837 non Necchi & Vis 2020 non Wagler 1830]
- "Qingyuzengella" Huang et al. 2024
- Ruminococcoides Molinero et al. 2021
- "Shuzhengia" Liu et al. 2021b
- "Ca. Vesiculincola" Treitli et al. 2023

Formerly within Oscillospiraceae

- Acetanaerobacterium
- Acutalibacter
- Anaerotruncus
- Faecalibacterium
