= Amylolytic process =

Conversion of starch into sugar

Amylolytic process or amylolysis is the conversion of starch into sugar by the action of acids or enzymes such as amylase.

Starch begins to pile up inside the leaves of plants during times of light when starch is able to be produced by photosynthetic processes. This ability to make starch disappears in the dark due to the lack of illumination; there is insufficient amount of light produced during the dark needed to carry this reaction forward. Turning starch into sugar is done by the enzyme amylase.

== Different pathways of amylase & location of amylase activity ==
The process in which amylase breaks down starch for sugar consumption is not consistent with all organisms that use amylase to breakdown stored starch. There are different amylase pathways that are involved in starch degradation, breaking them down into sugars. Degradation by the enzyme amylase was most commonly thought to take place in the chloroplast, but that has been proven wrong. One example is the spinach plant, in which the chloroplast contains both alpha and beta amylase (They are different versions of amylase involved in the breakdown of starch and they differ in their substrate specificity). In spinach leaves, the extrachloroplastic region contains the highest level of amylase degradation of starch. The difference between chloroplast and extrachloroplastic starch degradation is in the amylase pathway they prefer; either beta or alpha amylase. For spinach leaves, Alpha-amylase is preferred but for plants/organisms like wheat, barley, peas, etc. the Beta-amylase is preferred.

== Usage ==
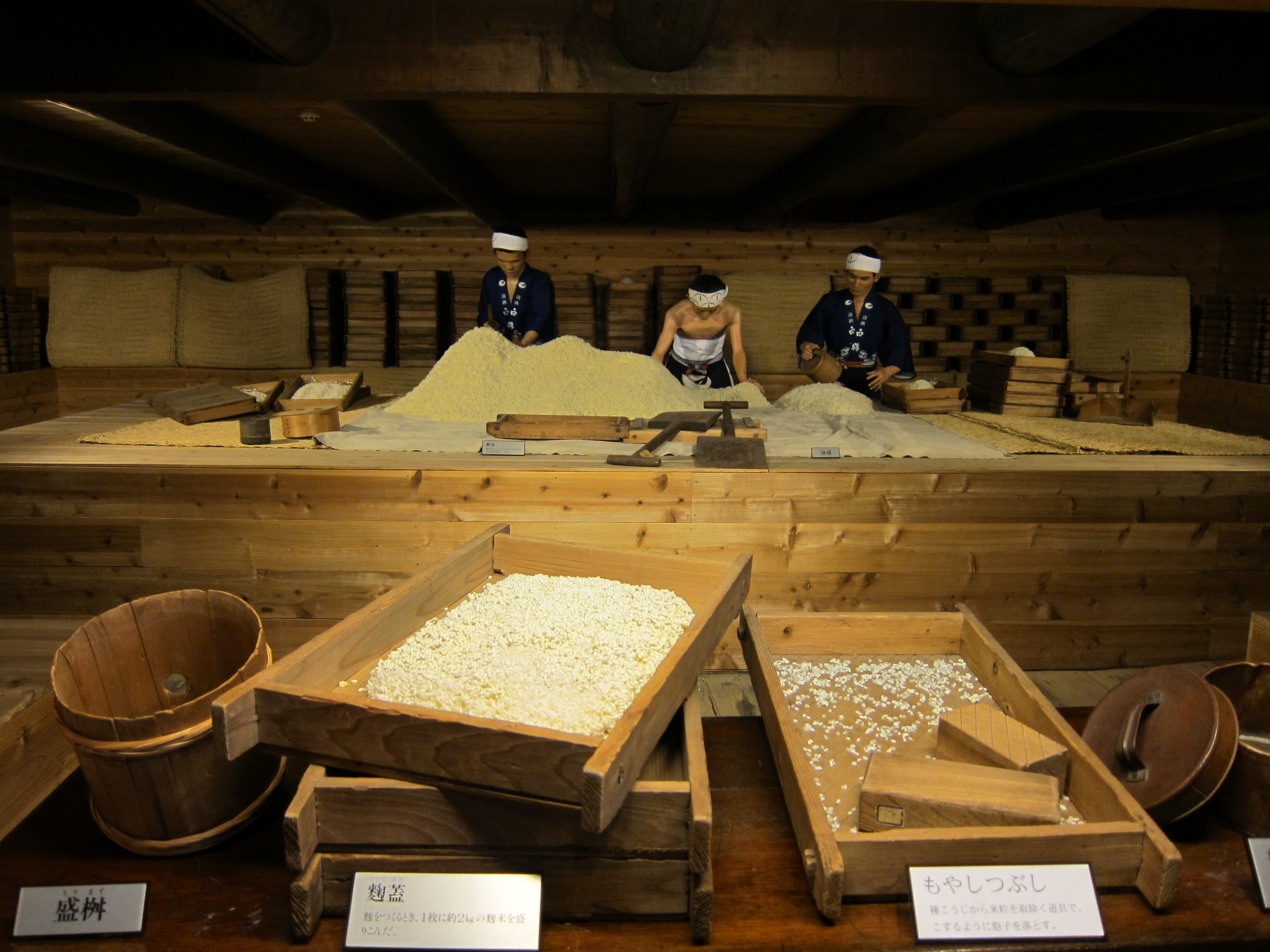
The mold Aspergillus oryzae causes amylolysis during sake brewing.

The amylolytic process is used in the brewing of alcohol from grains. Since grains contain starches but little to no simple sugars, the sugar needed to produce alcohol is derived from starch via the amylolytic process. In beer brewing, this is done through malting. In sake brewing, the mold Aspergillus oryzae provides amylolysis, and in Tapai, Saccharomyces cerevisiae. The amylolytic process can also be used to allow for maximum results in production. For instance, glucose formation, when amylolytic enzymes are added to a given compound, the enzymes work to give maximum formation. The amylolytic process is also useful in the breaking down of molecules, it can be closely associated with the process of hydrolysis.

== See also ==
- Brewing methods
