= Degree Lintner =

Unit used to measure diastatic power

°Lintner or degrees Lintner is a unit used to measure the ability of a malt to reduce starch to sugar, that is, its diastatic power. Degrees Lintner is an intensive unit, not an extensive one; it is independent of the quantity of malt used. While the measurement is applicable to any amylase, in general it refers to the combined α-amylase and β-amylase used in brewing. The term is also generalized to diastatic malt extracts and separately prepared brewing enzymes. The abbreviation °L is official, but in brewing applications it may conflict with °L used for degrees Lovibond.

JECFA, the Joint FAO/WHO Expert Committee on Food Additives, defines the degree Lintner as follows:

A malt has a diastatic power of 100 °L if 0.1cc of a clear 5% infusion of the malt, acting on 100cc of a 2% starch solution at 20°C for one hour, produces sufficient reducing sugars to reduce completely 5cc of Fehling's solution.

Note that the amylases used in brewing reach their peak efficiencies around 66 °C.

One can convert this definition to the number of international enzyme units (IU, enzyme activity that produces 1 μmole of product per minute) per gram of grain, for example. Maltose, the main sugar produced in mashing, is a disaccharide of glucose with one reducing equivalent (one reactive aldehyde group). One maltose will reduce two Cu^{2+} in the Fehling reaction. The concentration of Cu^{2+} in Fehling’s solution is 0.14 M, which is capable of oxidizing 0.070 M maltose. 5 mL of Fehling’s solution can oxidize 0.070 M x 0.005 L = 0.00035 moles of maltose. A 100 °L malt extract produces 0.00035 mol maltose in 60 min, or 5.8 μmol/min, or 5.8 IU of enzyme activity in 0.1 mL of a 5 g/100 mL (5%) infusion. The 0.1 mL of this infusion is equivalent to 0.005 g of malt. Therefore, 5.8 IU/0.005 g of malt = 1160 IU/gram of malt. 100 °L is equivalent to 1160 IU per gram of malt (or 526,176 IU per pound). This value is useful if alternatives to Fehling's reaction are being used to determine the amylase activity.

Evaluation of a malt or extract is usually done by the manufacturer rather than by the end user; as a rule of thumb, the total grain bill of a mash should have a diastatic power of at least 40 °L in order to guarantee efficient conversion of all the starches in the mash to sugars.

The most active barley malts currently available have a diastatic activity of 110 - 160 °Lintner (385 - 520 °WK).

In Europe, diastatic activity is often stated in Windisch–Kolbach units (°WK). These are related approximately to °Lintner by:

$${}^\circ\mbox{Lintner} = \frac{{}^\circ\mbox{WK} + 16}{3.5}$$
$${}^\circ\mbox{WK} = \left ( 3.5 \times {}^\circ\mbox{Lintner} \right ) - 16$$.
