= Glycogenase =

Glycogenase may refer to one of two enzymes:

- α-Amylase
- β-Amylase
