= °L =

°L may refer to:

- °Lintner, a scale for measuring enzymatic activity
- °Lovibond, a scale for measuring transparency
