= Windisch–Kolbach unit =

Unit of measurement

°WK or degrees Windisch-Kolbach is a unit for measuring the diastatic power of malt, named after the German brewer Wilhelm Windisch and the Luxembourgish brewer Paul Kolbach. It is a common unit in beer brewing (especially in Europe) that measures the ability of enzymes in malt to reduce starch to sugar (maltose). It is defined as the amount of maltose formed by 100 g of malt in 30 min at 20 °C. Degrees Lintner is a unit used in the United States for the same purpose. The conversion is as follows:

${}^\circ\mbox{Lintner} = \frac{{}^\circ\mbox{WK} + 16}{3.5}$

${}^\circ\mbox{WK} = \left ( 3.5 \cdot {}^\circ\mbox{Lintner} \right ) - 16$.

334 °WK = 3.014×10^{−7} Katal
