= Ectonucleoside triphosphate diphosphohydrolase 7 =

Protein-coding gene in the species Homo sapiens

ENTPD7

Identifiers
- Aliases: ENTPD7, LALP1, ectonucleoside triphosphate diphosphohydrolase 7
- External IDs: OMIM: 616753; MGI: 2135885; GeneCards: ENTPD7
Enzyme activity
EC #	BRENDA	ExPASy	KEGG	MetaCyc
3.6.1.15	↗	↗	↗	↗

Gene location (Human)
Chr.	Chromosome 10 (human)
Band	10q24.2	Start	99,659,509 bp
Band	10q24.2	End	99,711,241 bp

Gene location (Mouse)
Chr.	Chromosome 19 (mouse)
Band	19|19 C3	Start	43,678,111 bp
Band	19|19 C3	End	43,722,136 bp
RNA expression pattern
Bgee	Human / Mouse (ortholog); Top expressed in: jejunal mucosa; buccal mucosa cell; duodenum; mucosa of ileum; sperm; secondary oocyte; cartilage tissue; stromal cell of endometrium; mucosa of sigmoid colon; testicle / Top expressed in: jejunum; pyloric antrum; duodenum; intestinal epithelium; cumulus cell; gastrula; epithelium of small intestine; motor neuron; intestinal villus; seminal vesicula; More reference expression data
BioGPS	n/a
Gene ontology
Molecular function	hydrolase activity; metal ion binding; nucleoside-triphosphatase activity
Cellular component	integral component of membrane; cytoplasmic vesicle membrane; membrane; cytoplasmic vesicle; endocytic vesicle membrane
Biological process	nucleobase-containing small molecule catabolic process
Sources:Amigo / QuickGO
Orthologs
Databases	NCBI: entry; OMA: entry
Species	Human	Mouse
Entrez	57089	93685
Ensembl	ENSG00000198018	ENSMUSG00000025192
UniProt	Q9NQZ7	Q3TCT4
RefSeq (mRNA)	NM_020354; NM_001349962; NM_001349963	NM_053103
RefSeq (protein)	NP_065087; NP_001336891; NP_001336892	NP_444333
Location (UCSC)	Chr 10: 99.66 – 99.71 Mb	Chr 19: 43.68 – 43.72 Mb
PubMed search
- Wikidata
View/Edit Human	View/Edit Mouse

Ectonucleoside triphosphate diphosphohydrolase 7 is a protein that in humans is encoded by the ENTPD7 gene.

== Function ==
This gene encodes a purine-converting ectoenzyme which belongs to the ecto-nucleoside triphosphate diphosphohydrolase (E-NTPDase) family. The encoded protein hydrolyzes extracellular nucleoside triphosphates (UTP, GTP, and CTP) to nucleoside monophosphates as part of a purinergic signaling pathway. It contains two transmembrane domains at the N- and C-termini and a large, hydrophobic catalytic domain located in between. This gene affects oxidative stress as well as DNA damage and is a mediator of senescence. [provided by RefSeq, Mar 2017].
