= AMY1C =

Protein-coding gene in humans

Identifiers
- Aliases: AMY1C, AMY1, amylase, alpha 1C (salivary), amylase alpha 1C (salivary), amylase alpha 1C
- External IDs: OMIM: 104702; GeneCards: AMY1C
Enzyme activity
| EC # | BRENDA | ExPASy | KEGG | MetaCyc |
|---|---|---|---|---|
| 3.2.1.1 | ↗ | ↗ | ↗ | ↗ |

Gene location (Human)
| Chr. | Chromosome 1 (human) |
| Band | 1p21.1 | Start | 103,745,323 bp |
| Band | 1p21.1 | End | 103,758,726 bp |
RNA expression pattern
| Bgee | Human / Mouse (ortholog); Top expressed in: right uterine tube; testicle; olfactory zone of nasal mucosa; gonad; right lobe of thyroid gland; left lobe of thyroid gland; body of pancreas; right lung; upper lobe of left lung; left testis / n/a; More reference expression data |
| BioGPS | n/a |
Orthologs
| Databases | NCBI: entry; OMA: entry |
| Species | Human | Mouse |
| Entrez | 278 | n/a |
| Ensembl | ENSG00000187733 | n/a |
| UniProt | P0DTE8 | n/a |
| RefSeq (mRNA) | NM_001008219; NM_001346780 | n/a |
| RefSeq (protein) | NP_001008220; NP_001333709 | n/a |
| Location (UCSC) | Chr 1: 103.75 – 103.76 Mb | n/a |
| PubMed search | | n/a |
- Wikidata
| View/Edit Human |

Alpha-amylase 1C is a digestive enzyme that in humans is encoded by the gene AMY1C. This saliva enzyme functions to initiate the break down of starch and other carbohydrates. AMY1C is one of a collection of nearby human genes (including AMY1A and AMY1B) that encode identical saliva alpha-amylase proteins, with the exact number of genes varying from individual to individual.

== Function ==
Amylases are secreted proteins that hydrolyze 1,4-alpha-glucoside bonds in oligosaccharides and polysaccharides, and thus catalyze the first step in digestion of dietary starch and glycogen. The human genome has a cluster of several amylase genes that are expressed at high levels in either the salivary glands (AMY1A, AMY1B, AMY1C) or pancreas (AMY2A, AMY2B). This gene encodes an amylase isoenzyme produced by the salivary gland. See also Amylase § Evolution.
