= Phadebas =

Phadebas is a synthetic biochemical substrate used for both qualitative and quantitative assessment of the α-amylase enzyme. Its active component is DSM-P, microspheres in which a blue dye has been chemically bound. When the substrate is digested by the amylase enzyme in solution, it releases that blue dye at a rate proportional to the quantity of the enzyme present. It is used in a range of applications from quality control tests for food & beverages to detection of saliva stains in forensic investigations.

== History ==
The "Phadebas Amylase Test" (PAT) was the first product developed by Pharmacia Diagnostics and was launched in 1970. The name Phadebas is an abbreviation of Pharmacia Diagnostics Biologically Active Substances. In the 70s, PAT was used in hospitals worldwide as an in vitro diagnostics test for acute pancreatitis but the application was later outrivaled by automatic analysis systems. PAT is no longer marketed for the IVD-market and no longer upholds its EC-certificate. Even though the original application has vanished the product is still used as a colouring agent in some clinical assays. Phadebas does not play an active role in the later diagnosis in these assays. The semi-manual method of Phadebas proved to function in other applications outside of the IVD-market. The method was taken up by forensic laboratories and by the food and chemical industry. In 2005 the company was acquired by Magle Life Sciences and in 2007, Phadebas Forensic was launched as a first diversification within the product family. Three years later, Phadebas Honey Diastase Test was launched resulting in totally eight products in the Phadebas portfolio.

== Applications ==
Phadebas is used in a wide range of applications from quality control tests for food & beverages to detection of saliva stains in forensic investigation.

=== Research and quality ===
PAT is used for accurately determining α-amylase for a wide variety of industrial as well as academic applications, e.g.;

- α-amylase from detergents
- Biotech research & development (e.g., bacterial excretion of amylase)
- Dentistry applications
- Reagent for the clinical diagnosis of pancreatitis
- Specialty chemicals

=== Forensics ===
The Phadebas Forensic Press test is used as a presumptive test for saliva. Phadebas may be used to find saliva as a DNA source, or to identify the origin of a stain. The test is performed by placing paper bound with the Phadebas substrate to a sample, and applying pressure. It is a more sensitive and selective method to identify saliva stains than alternate light sources as these stains do not strongly fluoresce and may be confused with other biological fluids such as semen. The test may be considered selective for saliva as α-amylase activity in saliva is typically several orders of magnitude higher than in other body fluids. A study has shown that as many as 40% of saliva stains on garments go undetected when using alternate light sources. The test is capable of locating saliva deposits with little dependence on the porosity of the substrate.

==== Specificity to saliva ====
There are other bodily substances that can test positive for alpha-amylase using the Phadebas Forensic Press test. Some examples include faeces, semen, urine and tears. Although there is possibility of false positives from other sources of amylase, the instructions for use published by Phadebas Forensic state that no other forensically relevant biological fluid (with the exception of faeces) will react within 10 minutes of performing the test. It is also been shown that certain undiluted detergents can cause a positive reaction when tested with the Phadebas amylase test. The test is not human specific; it is sensitive to saliva from other species, amylase from microbes such as Baccilus and extracts from certain plants including apple and cabbage.

=== Alimentary ===
The test is used for determining α-amylase in a wide variety of food applications, for example in food and beverages:

- Egg powder
- Wheat
- Milk
- Honey

According to the EU Honey Directive, diastase activity is a composition criterion that must be determined for honeys intended for human consumption. The official analysis methods for the determination of diastase activity in honey are the Schade assay and Phadebas assays, recommended by the International Honey Commission. As this method is based on fixed equations instead of a standard curve the new Phadebas honey diastase test was developed, to ensure stable results independent of batch.
