= Endoenzyme =

An endoenzyme, or intracellular enzyme, is an enzyme that functions within the cell in which it was produced. Because the majority of enzymes fall within this category, the term is used primarily to differentiate a specific enzyme from an exoenzyme. It is possible for a single enzyme to have both endoenzymatic and exoenzymatic functions; for example, glycolytic enzymes of Kreb's Cycle. In most cases the term endoenzyme refers to an enzyme that binds to a bond 'within the body' of a large molecule - usually a polymer. For example, an endoamylase would break down large amylose molecules into shorter dextrin chains. On the other hand, an exoenzyme removes subunits from the polymer one at a time from one end; in effect it can only act at the end ponts of a polymer. An exoamylase would therefore remove one glucose molecule at a time from the end of an amylose molecule.
