= AMY1A =

Protein-coding gene in humans

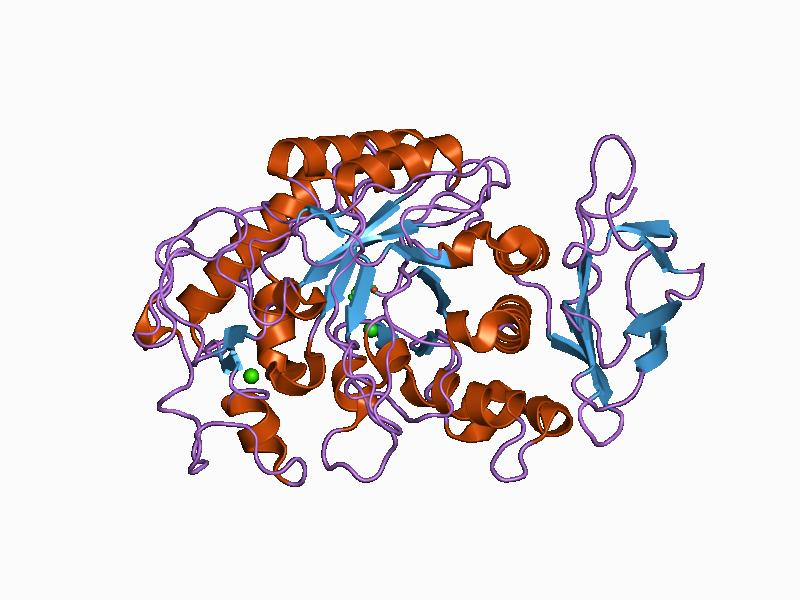

Identifiers
- Aliases: AMY1A, AMY1, amylase, alpha 1A (salivary), amylase alpha 1A (salivary), amylase alpha 1A
- External IDs: OMIM: 104700; GeneCards: AMY1A
Available structures
PDB	Human UniProt search: PDBe RCSB
PDB	List of PDB id codes 1C8Q, 1JXJ, 1JXK, 1MFU, 1MFV, 1NM9, 1Q4N, 1SMD, 1XV8, 1Z32, 3BLK, 3BLP, 3DHP
Enzyme activity
EC #	BRENDA	ExPASy	KEGG	MetaCyc
3.2.1.1	↗	↗	↗	↗

Gene location (Human)
Chr.	Chromosome 1 (human)
Band	1p21.1	Start	103,655,760 bp
Band	1p21.1	End	103,664,554 bp
RNA expression pattern
Bgee	Human / Mouse (ortholog); Top expressed in: body of pancreas; testicle; right uterine tube; gonad; olfactory zone of nasal mucosa; tonsil; right lobe of thyroid gland; placenta; left lobe of thyroid gland; salivary gland / n/a; More reference expression data
BioGPS	n/a
Gene ontology
Molecular function	protein binding; alpha-amylase activity; hydrolase activity; catalytic activity; metal ion binding; hydrolase activity, acting on glycosyl bonds; cation binding
Cellular component	extracellular region; extracellular exosome; extracellular space
Biological process	digestion; metabolism; carbohydrate metabolic process
Sources:Amigo / QuickGO
Orthologs
Databases	NCBI: entry; OMA: entry
Species	Human	Mouse
Entrez	276	n/a
Ensembl	ENSG00000237763	n/a
UniProt	P0DUB6	n/a
RefSeq (mRNA)	NM_004038; NM_001008221	n/a
RefSeq (protein)	NP_001008222; NP_004029	n/a
Location (UCSC)	Chr 1: 103.66 – 103.66 Mb	n/a
PubMed search		n/a
- Wikidata
View/Edit Human

Alpha-amylase 1A is a digestive enzyme that in humans is encoded by the AMY1A gene. This enzyme is found in saliva and functions to start the break down of carbohydrates like starch. AMY1A is one of a collection of nearby human genes (including AMY1B and AMY1C) that encode identical saliva alpha-amylase proteins, with the specific number of genes varying from individual to individual.

== Function ==
Amylases are secreted proteins that hydrolyze 1,4-alpha-glucoside bonds in oligosaccharides and polysaccharides, and thus catalyze the first step in digestion of dietary starch and glycogen. The human genome has a cluster of several amylase genes that are expressed at high levels in either the salivary glands (AMY1A, AMY1B, and AMY1C) or pancreas (AMY2A and AMY2B). This gene encodes an amylase isoenzyme produced by the salivary gland. Alternative splicing results in multiple transcript variants encoding the same protein.

== See also ==
- Alpha-amylase
- AMY2A
- Amylase § Evolution
