= AMY2B =

Protein-coding gene in humans

Identifiers
- Aliases: AMY2B, AMY2, AMY3, HXA, amylase, alpha 2B (pancreatic), amylase alpha 2B (pancreatic), amylase alpha 2B
- External IDs: OMIM: 104660; MGI: 3714985; GeneCards: AMY2B
Enzyme activity
EC #	BRENDA	ExPASy	KEGG	MetaCyc
3.2.1.1	↗	↗	↗	↗

Gene location (Human)
Chr.	Chromosome 1 (human)
Band	1p21.1	Start	103,553,815 bp
Band	1p21.1	End	103,579,534 bp

Gene location (Mouse)
Chr.	Chromosome 3 (mouse)
Band	3 F3|3	Start	113,219,771 bp
Band	3 F3|3	End	113,231,368 bp
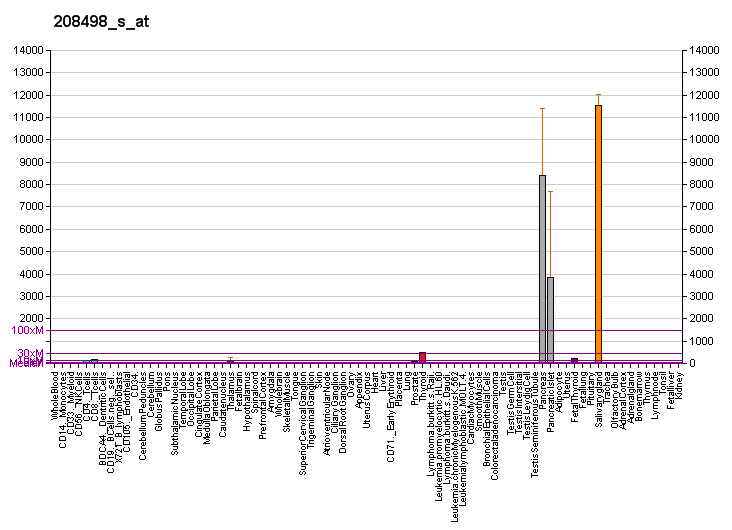
RNA expression pattern
Bgee	Human / Mouse (ortholog); Top expressed in: body of pancreas; right uterine tube; cerebellar hemisphere; right hemisphere of cerebellum; gastric mucosa; left lobe of thyroid gland; tibial nerve; right lobe of thyroid gland; apex of heart; Achilles tendon / Top expressed in: pancreas; islet of Langerhans; stomach; colon; esophagus; duodenum; jejunum; quadriceps femoris muscle; spermatid; ileum; More reference expression data
BioGPS	More reference expression data
Gene ontology
Molecular function	catalytic activity; alpha-amylase activity; hydrolase activity; metal ion binding; hydrolase activity, acting on glycosyl bonds; cation binding
Cellular component	extracellular region; extracellular exosome
Biological process	digestion; metabolism; carbohydrate metabolic process
Sources:Amigo / QuickGO
Orthologs
Databases	NCBI: entry; OMA: entry
Species	Human	Mouse
Entrez	280	100043686
Ensembl	ENSG00000240038	ENSMUSG00000093931
UniProt	P19961	P00688
RefSeq (mRNA)	NM_020978; NM_001386109; NM_001387437	NM_001160151
RefSeq (protein)	NP_066188	NP_001036176; NP_001153622; NP_001153623; NP_001153624
Location (UCSC)	Chr 1: 103.55 – 103.58 Mb	Chr 3: 113.22 – 113.23 Mb
PubMed search
- Wikidata
View/Edit Human	View/Edit Mouse

Alpha-amylase 2B is a digestive enzyme that in humans is encoded by the AMY2B gene. This enzyme functions to break down carbohydrates, especially large carbohydrates like starch. This enzyme (along with AMY2A) is one of the primary alpha-amylases secreted by the acinar cells of the pancreas into pancreatic juice, which is released into the small intestines.

== Function ==
Amylases are secreted proteins that hydrolyze 1,4-alpha-glucoside bonds in oligosaccharides and polysaccharides, and thus catalyze the first step in digestion of dietary starch and glycogen. The human genome has a cluster of several amylase genes that are expressed at high levels in either the salivary glands (AMY1A, AMY1B, AMY1C) or pancreas (AMY2A, AMY2B). This gene encodes an amylase isoenzyme produced by the pancreas. Similar to AMY1, the number of AMY2-encoding genes varies from individual to individual, however the proteins encoded by AMY2A and AMY2B are not identical (though they are ~99% similar).

== Promotor region ==
AMY2B is distinct from AMY2A and the AMY1 genes by a difference in its promotor region. All AMY1 and AMY2 genes have a γ-actin pseudogene located in their promotor region. In all but AMY2B, this pseudogene is interrupted by a retroviral-like sequence. This may impact the regulation of these genes, and has been cited as evidence for the claim that the (salivary) AMY1 genes originated as copies of an AMY2 gene (see Amylase § Evolution).
