= Macroamylasemia =

Presence of macroamylase in the blood

Macroamylasemia is the presence of macroamylase in the blood. Macroamylase is a complex of the enzyme amylase bound to other proteins forming a larger molecule. Macroamylase is typically composed of immunoglobulin A (IgA, 70%) and less often of immunoglobulin G (IgG, 30%). The association of amylase with some drugs has also been reported.

The macroamylase molecules are unable to pass through the kidneys and are therefore retained in the blood, leading to elevated levels of amylase in the bloodstream. In contrast, amylase urine levels are normal.

== Presentation ==
Macroamylasemia is usually a benign condition, and people usually do not experience any symptoms or health problems. In fact, it is often discovered incidentally during a routine blood test. However, in some rare cases, macroamylasemia can cause recurrent abdominal pain or other gastrointestinal symptoms.

== Causes ==
Macroamylasemia is a relatively rare condition, and in most cases, the exact cause is unknown. It can occur in completely healthy individuals without symptoms, in association with autoimmune diseases (such as systemic lupus erythematosus) and other diseases (cancer or inflammatory diseases).

However, there are some risk factors that can increase the likelihood of developing the condition:

- Autoimmune disorder, such as systemic lupus erythematosus (SLE), rheumatoid arthritis, and Sjögren's syndrome
- Chronic liver disease, such as cirrhosis
- Certain medications, including thiazide diuretics and opiates
- Genetic factors: There may be a genetic component

== Diagnosis ==
Diagnosis of macroamylasemia is typically made by measuring the amylase levels in the blood and urine and performing additional tests to confirm the presence of macroamylase.

== Management ==
Treatment is usually not necessary unless the patient is experiencing symptoms or complications related to the condition.
