= Mash ingredients =

Essential ingredients for brewing

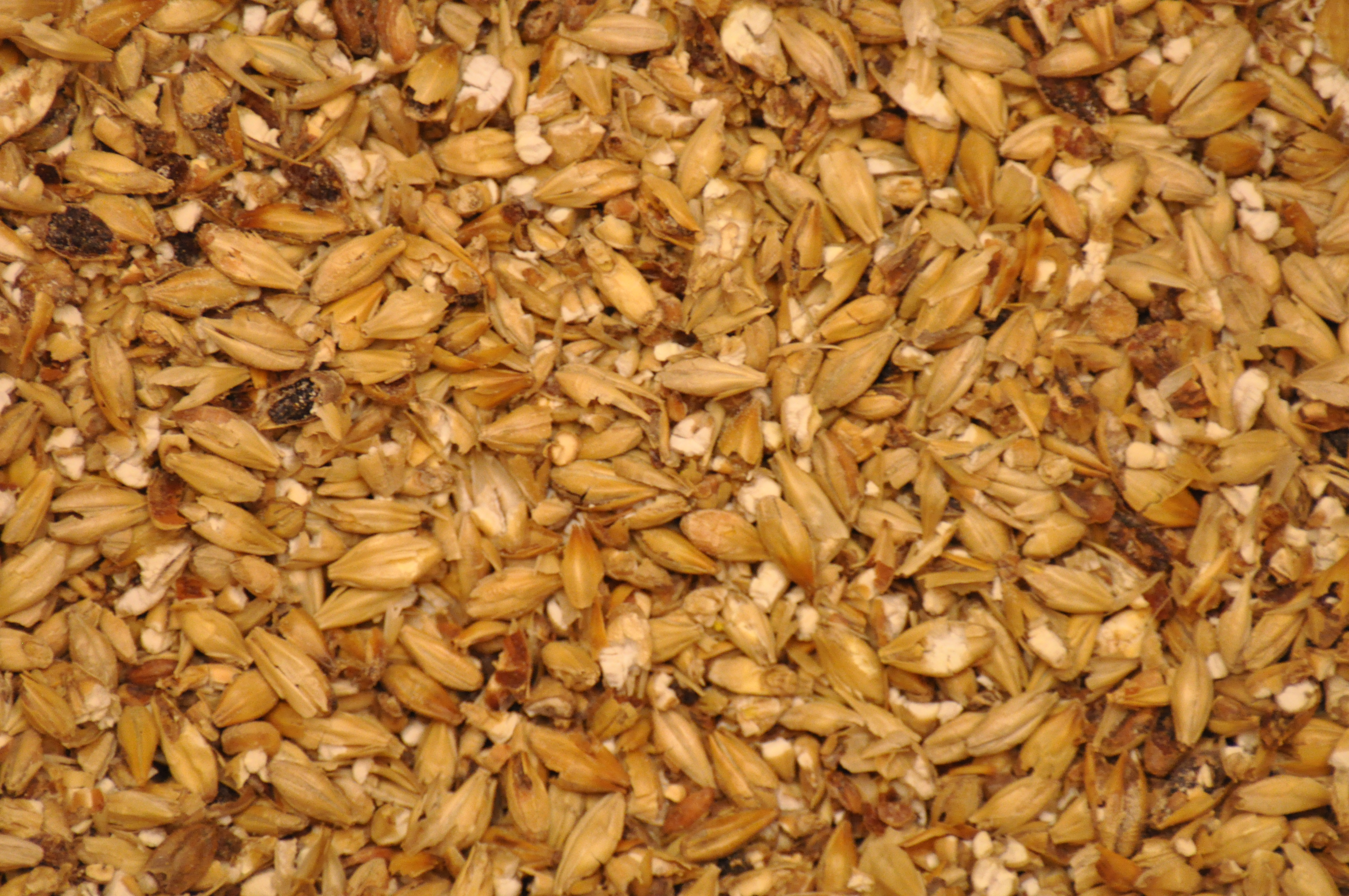
Malted barley – a primary mash ingredient

Mash ingredients, mash bill, mashbill, or grain bill are the materials that brewers use to produce the wort that they then ferment into beer or whisky. Mashing is the act of creating and extracting fermentable and non-fermentable sugars and flavor components from grain by steeping it in hot water, and then letting it rest at specific temperature ranges to activate naturally occurring enzymes in the grain that convert starches to sugars. The sugars separate from the mash ingredients, and then yeast in the brewing process converts them to alcohol and other fermentation products.

A typical primary mash ingredient is grain that has been malted. Modern-day malt recipes generally consist of a large percentage of a light malt and, optionally, smaller percentages of more flavorful or highly colored types of malt. The former is called "base malt"; the latter is known as "specialty malts".

The grain bill of a beer or whisky may vary widely in the number and proportion of ingredients. For example, in beer-making, a simple pale ale might contain a single malted grain, while a complex porter may contain a dozen or more ingredients. In whisky production, Bourbon uses a mash made primarily from maize (often mixed with rye or wheat and a small amount of malted barley), and single malt Scotch exclusively uses malted barley.

== Variables ==
Each particular ingredient has its own flavor that contributes to the final character of the beverage. In addition, different ingredients carry other characteristics, not directly relating to the flavor, which may dictate some of the choices made in brewing: nitrogen content, diastatic power, color, modification, and conversion.

=== Nitrogen content ===
The nitrogen content of a grain relates to the mass fraction of the grain that is made up of protein, and is usually expressed as a percentage; this fraction is further refined by distinguishing what fraction of the protein is water-soluble, also usually expressed as a percentage; 40% is typical for most beermaking grains. Generally, brewers favor lower-nitrogen grains, while distillers favor high-nitrogen grains.

In most beermaking, an average nitrogen content in the grains of at most 10% is sought; higher protein content, especially the presence of high-mass proteins, causes "chill haze", a cloudy visual quality to the beer. However, this is mostly a cosmetic desire dating from the mass production of glassware for presenting serving beverages; traditional styles such as sahti, saison, and bière de garde, as well as several Belgian styles, make no special effort to create a clear product. The quantity of high-mass proteins can be reduced during the mash by making use of a protease rest.

In Britain, preferred brewers' grains are often obtained from winter harvests and grown in low-nitrogen soil; in central Europe, no special changes are made for the grain-growing conditions and multi-step decoction mashing is favored instead.

Distillers, by contrast, are not as constrained by the amount of protein in their mash as the non-volatile nature of proteins means that none is included in the final distilled product. Therefore, distillers seek out higher-nitrogen grains to ensure a more efficiently made product. Higher-protein grains generally have more diastatic power.

=== Diastatic power ===
Diastatic power (DP), also called the "diastatic activity" or "enzymatic power", is a property of malts (grains that have begun to germinate) that refers to the malt's ability to break down starches into simpler fermentable sugars during the mashing process. Germination produces a number of enzymes, such as amylase, that can convert the starch naturally present in barley and other grains into sugar. The mashing process activates these enzymes by soaking the grain in water at a controlled temperature.

In general, the hotter a grain is kilned, the less its diastatic activity. As a consequence, only lightly colored grains can be used as base malts, with Munich malt being the darkest base malt generally available.

Diastatic activity can also be provided by diastatic malt extract or by inclusion of separately-prepared brewing enzymes.

Diastatic power for a grain is measured in degrees Lintner (°Lintner or °L, although the latter can conflict with the symbol °L for Lovibond color); or in Europe by Windisch-Kolbach units (°WK). The two measures are related by

$${}^\circ\mbox{Lintner} = \frac{{}^\circ\mbox{WK} + 16}{3.5}$$
$${}^\circ\mbox{WK} = \left ( 3.5 \times {}^\circ\mbox{Lintner} \right ) - 16$$.

A malt with enough power to self-convert has a diastatic power near 35 °Lintner (94 °WK). Until recently, the most active, so-called "hottest", malts currently available were American six-row pale barley malts, which have a diastatic power of up to 160 °Lintner (544 °WK). Wheat malts have begun to appear on the market with diastatic power of up to 200 °Lintner. Although with the huskless wheat being somewhat difficult to work with, this is usually used in conjunction with barley, or as an addition to add high diastatic power to a mash.

=== Color ===
In brewing, the color of a grain or product is evaluated by the Standard Reference Method (SRM), Lovibond (°L), American Society of Brewing Chemists (ASBC) or European Brewery Convention (EBC) standards. While SRM and ASBC originate in North America and EBC in Europe, all three systems can be found in use throughout the world; degrees Lovibond has fallen out of industry use but has remained in use in homebrewing circles as the easiest to implement without a spectrophotometer. The darkness of grains range from as light as less than 2 SRM/4 EBC for Pilsener malt to as dark as 700 SRM/1600 EBC for black malt and roasted barley.

=== Modification ===
The quality of starches in a grain is variable with the strain of grain used and its growing conditions. "Modification" refers specifically to the extent to which starch molecules in the grain consist of simple chains of starch molecules versus branched chains; a fully modified grain contains only simple-chain starch molecules. A grain that is not fully modified requires mashing in multiple steps rather than at simply one temperature as the starches must be de-branched before amylase can work on them. One indicator of the degree of modification of a grain is that grain's Nitrogen ratio; that is, the amount of soluble Nitrogen (or protein) in a grain vs. the total amount of Nitrogen (or protein). This number is also referred to as the "Kolbach Index" and a malt with a Kolbach index between 36% and 42% is considered a malt that is highly modified and suitable for single infusion mashing. Maltsters use the length of the acrospire vs. the length of the grain to determine when the appropriate degree of modification has been reached before drying or kilning.

=== Conversion ===
Conversion is the extent to which starches in the grain have been enzymatically broken down into sugars. A caramel or crystal malt is fully converted before it goes into the mash; most malted grains have little conversion; unmalted grains, meanwhile, have little or no conversion. Unconverted starch becomes sugar during the last steps of mashing, through the action of alpha and beta amylases.

== Malts ==
The oldest and most predominant ingredient in brewing is barley, which has been used in beer-making for thousands of years. Modern brewing predominantly uses malted barley for its enzymatic power, but ancient Babylonian recipes indicate that without the ability to malt grain in a controlled fashion, baked bread was simply soaked in water. Malted barley dried at a sufficiently low temperature contains enzymes such as amylase, which convert starch into sugar. Therefore, sugars can be extracted from the barley's own starches simply by soaking the grain in water at a controlled temperature; this is mashing.

=== Pilsner malt ===
Pilsner malt, the basis of pale lager, is quite pale and strongly flavored. Invented in the 1840s, Pilsner malt is the lightest-colored generally available malt, and also carries a strong, sweet malt flavor. Usually a pale lager's grain bill consists entirely of this malt, which has enough enzymatic power to be used as a base malt. The commercial desirability of light-colored beers has also led to some British brewers adopting Pilsner malt (sometimes described simply as "lager malt" in Britain) in creating golden ales. In Germany, Pilsner malt is also used in some interpretations of the Kölsch style. ASBC 1–2/EBC 3–4, DP 60 °Lintner.

=== Pale malt ===
Pale malt is the basis of pale ale and bitter, and the precursor in production of most other British beer malts. Dried at temperatures sufficiently low to preserve all the brewing enzymes in the grain, it is light in color, and today, the cheapest barley malt available due to mass production. It can be used as a base malt—that is, as the malt constituting the majority of the grist—in many styles of beer. Typically, English pale malts are kilned at 95–105 °C. Color ASBC 2–3/EBC 5–7. Diastatic power (DP) 45 °Lintner.

=== Mild malt ===
Mild malt is often used as the base malt for mild ale, and is similar in color to pale malt. Mild malt is kilned at slightly higher temperatures than pale malt to provide a less neutral, rounder flavor generally described as "nutty". ASBC 3/EBC 6.

=== Amber malt ===
Amber malt is a more toasted form of pale malt, kilned at temperatures of 150–160 °C, and is used in brown porter; older formulations of brown porter use amber malt as a base malt (though this was diastatic and produced in different conditions from a modern amber malt). Amber malt has a bitter flavor that mellows on aging, and can be quite intensely flavored. In addition to its use in porter, it also appears in a diverse range of British beer recipes. ASBC 50–70/EBC 100–140; amber malt has no diastatic power.

=== Stout malt ===
Stout malt is sometimes seen as a base malt for stout beer; light in color, it is prepared so as to maximize diastatic power to better convert the large quantities of dark malts and unmalted grain used in stouts. In practice, however, most stout recipes make use of pale malt for its much greater availability. ASBC 2–3/EBC 4–6, DP 60–70 °Lintner.

=== Brown malt ===
Brown malt is a darker form of pale malt, and is used typically in brown ale, as well as in porter and stout.

=== Chocolate malt ===
Chocolate malt is similar to pale and amber malts, but kilned at even higher temperatures. Producing complex chocolate and cocoa flavours, it is used in porters and sweet stouts, as well as dark mild ales. It contains no enzymes. ASBC 450–500/EBC 1100–1300.

=== Black malt ===
Black malt, also called patent malt or black patent malt, is barley malt that has been kilned to the point of carbonizing, around 200 °C. The term "patent malt" comes from its invention in England in 1817, late enough that the inventor of the process for its manufacture, Daniel Wheeler, was awarded a patent. Black malt provides the colour and some of the flavour in black porter, contributing an acrid, ashy undertone to the taste. In small quantities, black malt can also be used to darken beer to a desired color, sometimes as a substitute for caramel colour. Due to its high kilning temperature, it contains no enzymes. ASBC 500-600/EBC >1300.

=== Crystal malt ===
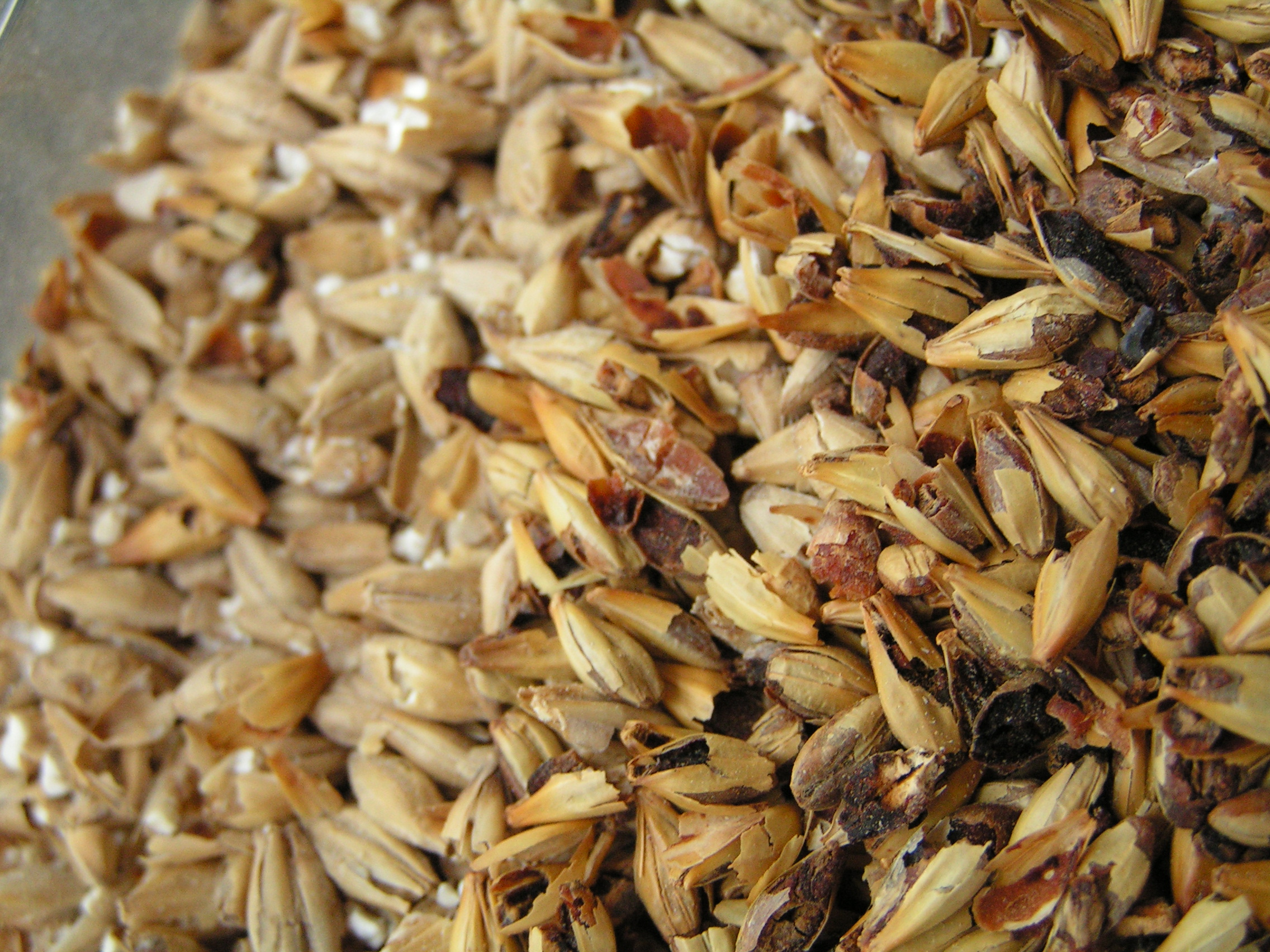
A paler example of crystal malt

Crystal malts, or caramel malts are prepared separately from pale malts. They are high-nitrogen malts that are wetted and roasted in a rotating drum before kilning. They produce strongly sweet toffee-like flavors and are sufficiently converted that they can be steeped without mashing to extract their flavor. Crystal malts are available in a range of colors, with darker-colored crystal malts kilned at higher temperatures, producing stronger, more caramel-like overtones. Some of the sugars in crystal malts caramelize during kilning and become unfermentable. Hence, adding crystal malt increases the final sweetness of a beer. They contain no enzymes. ASBC 50–165/EBC 90–320; the typical British crystal malt used in pale ale and bitter is around ASBC 70–80.

=== Distiller's malt ===
Standard distiller's malt or pot still malt is quite light and low in nitrogen compared to beer malts, these malts usually require a nitrogen of below 1.45%. These malts are used in the production of whiskey/whisky and generally originate from northern Scotland.

=== Peated malt ===
Peated malt is distiller's malt that has been smoked over burning peat, which imparts the aroma and flavor characteristics of Islay whisky and some Irish whiskey. Recently, some brewers have also included peated malt in interpretations of Scotch ales, although this is generally ahistorical. When peat is used in large amounts for beer-making, the resulting beer tends to have a very strong, earthy, and smoky flavor that most mainstream beer drinkers would find irregular.

=== Vienna malt ===
Vienna malt or Helles malt is the characteristic grain of Vienna lager and Märzen; although it generally takes up only 10 to 15% of the grain bill in a beer, it can be used as a base malt. It has sufficient enzymatic power to self-convert, and it is somewhat darker and kilned at a higher temperature than Pilsner malt. ASBC 3–4/EBC 7–10, DP 50 °Lintner.

=== Munich malt ===
Munich malt is used as the base malt of the bock beer style, especially doppelbock, and appears in dunkel lager and Märzens in smaller quantities. While a darker grain than pale malt, it has sufficient diastatic power to self-convert, despite being kilned at temperatures around 115 °C. It imparts "malty", although not necessarily sweet characteristics, depending on mashing temperatures. ASBC 4–6/EBC 10–15, DP 40 °Lintner.

=== Rauchmalz ===
Rauchmalz is a German malt prepared by being dried over an open flame rather than via kiln. The grain has a smoky aroma and is an essential ingredient in Bamberg Rauchbier.

=== Acid malt ===
Acid malt, also known as acidulated malt, whose grains contain lactic acid, can be used as a continental analog to Burtonization. Acid malt lowers the mash pH and provides a rounder, fuller character to the beer, enhancing the flavor of Pilseners and other light lagers. Lowering the pH also helps prevent beer spoilage through oxidation.

=== Other malts ===
Honey malt is an intensely flavored, lightly colored malt. 18–20 °L.

Melanoidin malt, a malt like the Belgian Aromatic malt, adds roundness and malt flavor to a beer with a comparably small addition in the grain bill. It also stabilizes the flavor.

=== Unmalted barley ===
Unmalted barley kernels are used in mashes for some Irish whiskey.

Roast barley is unmalted barley kernels toasted in an oven until almost black. Roast barley is, after base malt, usually the most-used grain in stout beers, contributing the majority of the flavor and the characteristic dark-brown color; undertones of chocolate and coffee are common. ASBC 500–600/EBC >1300 or more, no diastatic activity.

Black barley is like roast barley except even darker, and may be used in stouts. It has a strong, astringent flavor and contains no enzymes.

Flaked barley is unmalted, dried barley rolled into flat flakes. It imparts a rich, grainy flavor to beer and is used in many stouts, especially Guinness; it also improves head formation and retention.

Torrefied barley is barley kernels that have been heated until they pop like popcorn.

== Other grains ==
=== Wheat ===
==== Wheat malt ====
Beer brewed in the German Hefeweizen style relies heavily on malted wheat as a grain. Under the Reinheitsgebot, wheat was treated separately from barley, as it was the more expensive grain.

==== Torrefied wheat ====
Torrefied wheat is used in British brewing to increase the size and retention of a head in beer. Generally, it is used as an enhancer rather than for its flavor.

==== Raw wheat ====
Belgian witbier and Lambic make heavy use of raw wheat in their grist. It provides the distinctive taste and clouded appearance in a witbier and the more complex carbohydrates needed for the wild yeast and bacteria that make a lambic.

==== Wheat flour ====
Until the general availability of torrefied wheat, wheat flour was often used for similar purposes in brewing. Brewer's flour is only rarely available today, and is of a larger grist than baker's flour.

=== Oats ===
Oats in the form of rolled or steel-cut oats are used as mash ingredients in oatmeal stout. Oat malt was historically used alongside barley in preindustrial English beers, and is still produced by some maltsters.

=== Rye ===
The use of rye in a beer typifies the rye beer style, especially the German Roggenbier. Rye is also used in the Slavic kvass and Finnish sahti farmhouse styles, as readily available grains in eastern Europe. However, the use of rye in brewing is considered difficult, as rye lacks a hull (like wheat) and contains large quantities of beta-glucans compared to other grains; these long-chain sugars can leach out during a mash, creating a sticky, gelatinous gum in the mash tun, and as a result, brewing with rye requires a long, thorough beta-glucanase rest. Rye is said to impart a spicy, dry flavor to beer.

=== Sorghum and millet ===
Sorghum and millet are often used in African brewing. As gluten-free grains, they have gained popularity in the Northern Hemisphere as base materials for beers suitable for people with celiac disease.

Sorghum produces a dark, hazy beer. However, sorghum malt is difficult to prepare and rarely commercially available outside certain African countries.

Millet is an ingredient in chhaang and pomba, and both grains together are used in oshikundu.

=== Rice and maize ===
In the US, rice and maize (corn) are often used by commercial breweries as a means of adding fermentable sugars to a beer cheaply, due to the ready availability and low price of the grains. Maize is also the base grain in chicha and some cauim, as well as Bourbon whiskey and Tennessee whiskey, while rice is the base grain of happoshu and various mostly Asian fermented beverages often referred to as "rice wines", such as sake and makgeolli; maize is also used as an ingredient in some Belgian beers such as Rodenbach to lighten the body.

Maize was originally introduced into the brewing of American lagers because of the high protein content of the six-row barley; adding maize, which is high in sugar, but low in protein, helped thin out the body of the resulting beer. Increased amounts of maize use over time led to the development of the American pale lager style. Maize is generally not malted (although it is in some whiskey recipes), but instead introduced into the mash as flaked, dried kernels. Prior to a brew, rice and maize are cooked to allow the starch to gelatinize and thereby render it convertible.

== Non-cereal grains ==
Buckwheat and quinoa, while not cereal grasses (but are whole grains), both contain high levels of available starch and protein, while containing no gluten. Therefore, some breweries use these plants in the production of beer suitable for people with Celiac disease, either alone or in combination with sorghum.

== Syrups and extracts ==
Another way of adding sugar or flavoring to a malt beverage is the addition of natural or artificial sugar products such as honey, white sugar, dextrose, and/or malt extract. While these ingredients can be added during the mash, the enzymes in the mash do not act on them. Such ingredients can be added during the boil of the wort rather than the mash, and as such, are also known as copper sugars.

One syrup commonly used in mash, however, is dry or dried malt extract or DME, which is prepared by mashing malt in the normal fashion, then concentrating and spray drying the resulting wort. DME is used extensively in homebrewing as a substitute for base malt. It typically has no diastatic power because the enzymes are denatured in the production process.

Fruit beers, such as kriek lambic or framboise, are made using fruit.

== Regional differences ==
=== Britain ===
British brewing makes use of a wide variety of malts, with considerable stylistic freedom for the brewer to blend them. Many British malts were developed only as recently as the Industrial Revolution, as improvements in temperature-controlled kilning allowed finer control over the drying and toasting of the malted grains.

The typical British brewer's malt is a well-modified, low-nitrogen barley grown in the east of England or southeast of Scotland. In England, the best-known brewer's malt is made from the Maris Otter strain of barley; other common strains are Halcyon, Pipkin, Chariot, and Fanfare. Most malts in current use in Britain are derived from pale malt and were invented no earlier than the reign of Queen Anne. Brewing malt production in Britain is thoroughly industrialized, with barley grown on dedicated land and malts prepared in bulk in large, purpose-build maltings and distributed to brewers around the country to order.

=== Continental Europe ===
Before controlled-temperature kilning became available, malted grains were dried over wood fires; Rauchmalz (German: smoked malt) is malt dried using this traditional process. In Germany, beech is often used as the wood for the fire, imparting a strongly smoky flavor to the malt. This malt is then used as the primary component of rauchbier; alder-smoked malt is used in Alaskan smoked porters. Rauchmalz comes in several varieties, generally named for and corresponding to standard kilned varieties (e.g. Rauchpilsener to Pilsener); color and diastatic power are comparable to those for an equivalent kilned grain.

Similarly to crystal malts in Britain, central Europe makes use of caramel malts, which are moistened and kilned at temperatures around 55–65 °C in a rotating drum before being heated to higher temperatures for browning. The lower-temperature moistened kilning causes conversion and mashing to take place in the oven, resulting in a grain's starches becoming mostly or entirely converted to sugar before darkening. Caramel malts are produced in color grades analogous to other lager malts: carapils for pilsener malt, caravienne or carahell for Vienna malt, and caramunch for Munich malt. Color and final kilning temperature are comparable to non-caramel analog malts; there is no diastatic activity. Carapils malt is sometimes also called dextrin malt. 10–120 °L.

=== United States ===
American brewing combines British and Central European heritages, and as such uses all the above forms of beer malt; Belgian-style brewing is less common but its popularity is growing. In addition, America also makes use of some specialized malts:

6-row pale malt is a pale malt made from a different species of barley. Quite high in nitrogen, 6-row malt is used as a "hot" base malt for rapid, thorough conversion in a mash, as well as for extra body and fullness; the flavor is more neutral than 2-row malt. 1.8 °L, 160 °Lintner.

Victory malt is a specialized lightly roasted 2-row malt that provides biscuity, caramel flavors to a beer. Similar in color to amber and brown malt, it is often an addition to American brown ale. 25 °L, no diastatic power.

Other notable American barley malts include Special Roast and coffee malt. Special Roast is akin to a darker variety of victory malt.

=== Belgium ===
Belgian brewing makes use of the same grains as central European brewing. In general, though, Belgian malts are slightly darker and sweeter than their central European counterparts. In addition, Belgian brewing uses some local malts:

Pale malt in Belgium is generally darker than British pale malt. Kilning takes place at temperatures five to ten °C lower than for British pale malt, but for longer periods; diastatic power is comparable to that of British pale malt. ASBC 4/EBC 7.

Special B is a dark, intensely sweet crystal malt providing a strong malt flavor.

Biscuit malt is a lightly flavored roasted malt used to darken some Belgian beers. 45–50 EBC/25 °L.

Aromatic malt, by contrast, provides an intensely malty flavor. Kilned at 115 °C, it retains enough diastatic power to self-convert. 50–55 EBC/20 °L.

== See also ==
- Roasted grain drink
- Sour mash
- List of barley-based drinks
