= Glycoside hydrolase family 13 =

Alpha amylase, N-terminal ig-like domain
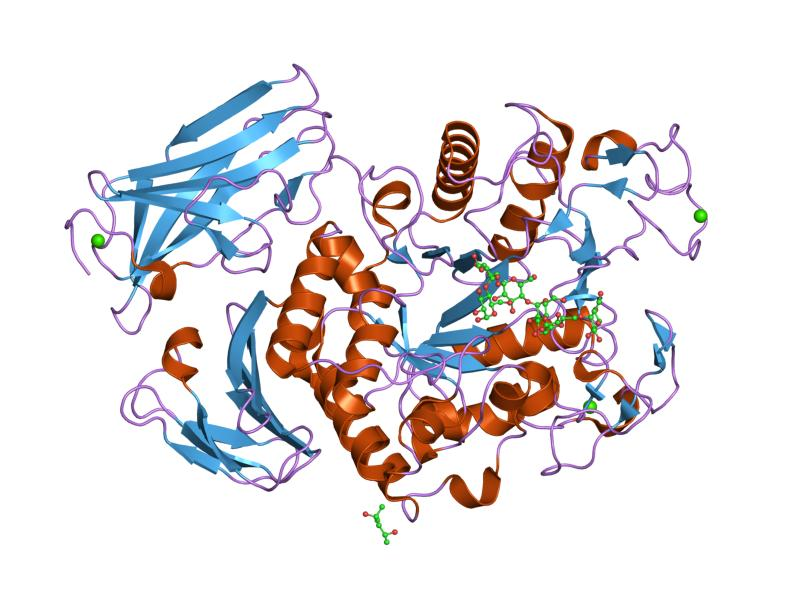
- crystal structure of thermoactinomyces vulgaris r-47 alpha-amylase 1 (tvai) mutant d356n/e396q complexed with p2, a pullulan model oligosaccharide

Identifiers
- Symbol: Alpha-amylase_N
- Pfam: PF02903
- InterPro: IPR004185
- SCOP2: 1sma / SCOPe / SUPFAM
Available protein structures:
- PDB: IPR004185 PF02903 (ECOD; PDBsum)
- AlphaFold: IPR004185; PF02903

Alpha-amylase catalytic domain
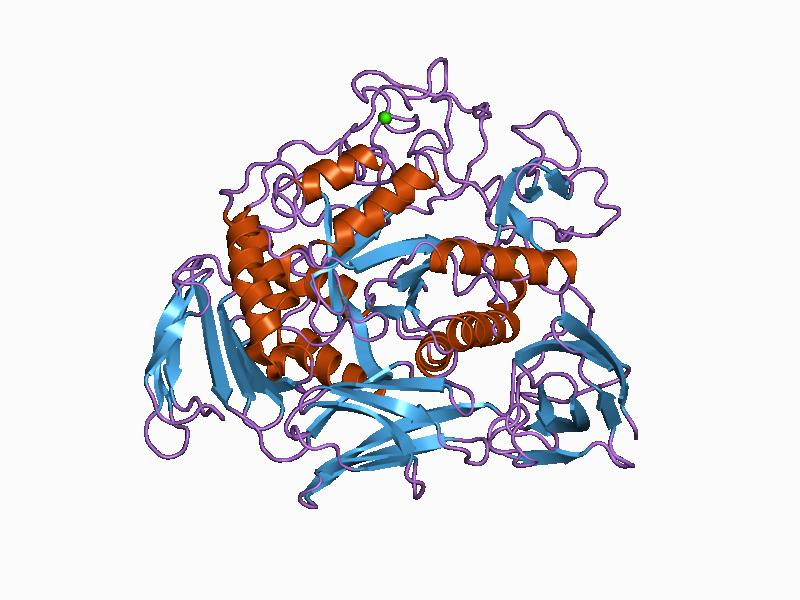
- cyclodextrin glucanotransferase (e.c.2.4.1.19) (cgtase)

Identifiers
- Symbol: Alpha-amylase
- Pfam: PF00128
- Pfam clan: CL0058
- InterPro: IPR006047
- SCOP2: 1ppi / SCOPe / SUPFAM
- CAZy: GH13
Available protein structures:
- PDB: IPR006047 PF00128 (ECOD; PDBsum)
- AlphaFold: IPR006047; PF00128

In molecular biology, glycoside hydrolase family 13 is a family of glycoside hydrolases.

Glycoside hydrolases EC 3.2.1. are a widespread group of enzymes that hydrolyse the glycosidic bond between two or more carbohydrates, or between a carbohydrate and a non-carbohydrate moiety. A classification system for glycoside hydrolases, based on sequence similarity, has led to the definition of >100 different families. This classification is available on the CAZy web site, and also discussed at CAZypedia, an online encyclopedia of carbohydrate active enzymes.

Enzymes containing this domain belong to family 13 (CAZY GH_13) of the glycosyl hydrolases. The maltogenic alpha-amylase is an enzyme which catalyses hydrolysis of (1-4)-alpha-D-glucosidic linkages in polysaccharides so as to remove successive alpha-maltose residues from the non-reducing ends of the chains in the conversion of starch to maltose. Other enzymes in this family include neopullulanase, which hydrolyses pullulan to panose, and cyclomaltodextrinase, which hydrolyses cyclodextrins.
