= Spirit blue =

Names
- IUPAC name 4-[(4-anilinophenyl)-(4-phenyliminocyclohexa-2,5-dien-1-ylidene)methyl]-N-phenylaniline hydrochloride
- Other names Opal blue SS, HSDB 466, Solvent Blue 23 monohydrochloride

Identifiers
CAS Number	2152-64-9
3D model (JSmol)	Interactive image
ChEBI	CHEBI:86483
ChemSpider	15674
ECHA InfoCard	100.016.766
EC Number	218-441-4
PubChem CID	16534
UNII	690DO205AX
CompTox Dashboard (EPA)	DTXSID3027457
- InChI: InChI=1S/C37H29N3.ClH/c1-4-10-31(11-5-1)38-34-22-16-28(17-23-34)37(29-18-24-35(25-19-29)39-32-12-6-2-7-13-32)30-20-26-36(27-21-30)40-33-14-8-3-9-15-33;/h1-27,38-39H;1H Key: JMCKWTQLJNQCTD-UHFFFAOYSA-N
- SMILES: C1=CC=C(C=C1)NC2=CC=C(C=C2)C(=C3C=CC(=NC4=CC=CC=C4)C=C3)C5=CC=C(C=C5)NC6=CC=CC=C6.Cl

Properties
Chemical formula	C_{37}H_{30}ClN_{3}
Molar mass	552.12 g·mol^{−1}
- Except where otherwise noted, data are given for materials in their standard state (at 25 °C [77 °F], 100 kPa). Infobox references

Spirit blue or Opal blue SS is a dye with formula C_{37}H_{30}ClN_{3}. It is used as an indicator in agar for detection of lipase activity in bacteria.
