= AMY2A =

Protein-coding gene in humans

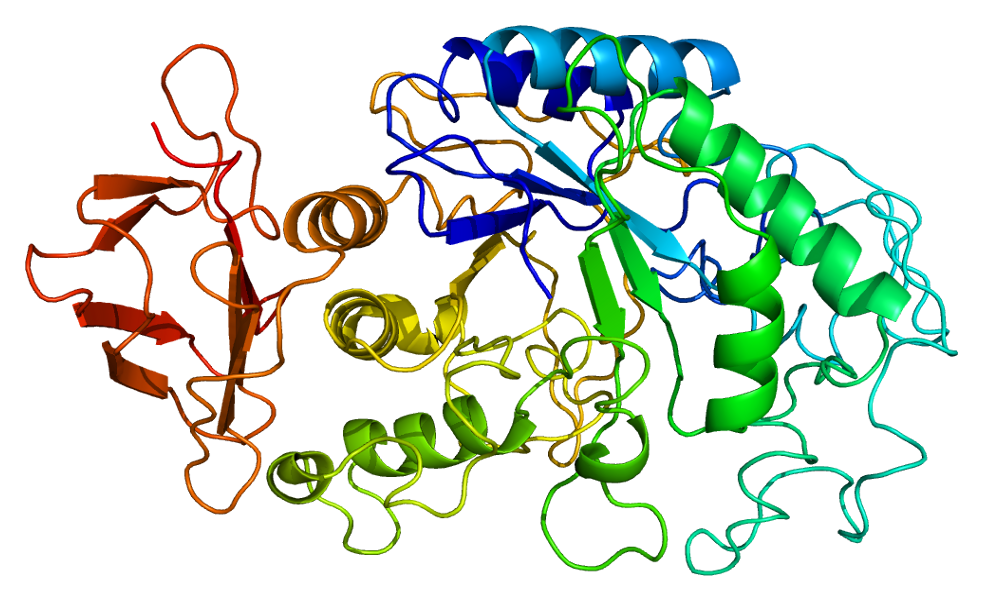

Identifiers
- Aliases: AMY2A, AMY2, AMY2B, PA, amylase, alpha 2A (pancreatic), amylase alpha 2A (pancreatic), amylase alpha 2A
- External IDs: OMIM: 104650; MGI: 88019; GeneCards: AMY2A
Available structures
PDB	Ortholog search: PDBe RCSB
PDB	List of PDB id codes 1B2Y, 1BSI, 1CPU, 1HNY, 1KB3, 1KBB, 1KBK, 1KGU, 1KGW, 1KGX, 1U2Y, 1U30, 1U33, 1XCW, 1XCX, 1XD0, 1XD1, 1XGZ, 1XH0, 1XH1, 1XH2, 2CPU, 2QMK, 2QV4, 3BAI, 3BAJ, 3BAK, 3BAW, 3BAX, 3BAY, 3CPU, 3IJ7, 3IJ8, 3IJ9, 3OLD, 3OLE, 3OLG, 3OLI, 4GQQ, 4GQR, 4W93, 4X9Y, 5EMY
Enzyme activity
EC #	BRENDA	ExPASy	KEGG	MetaCyc
3.2.1.1	↗	↗	↗	↗

Gene location (Human)
Chr.	Chromosome 1 (human)
Band	1p21.1	Start	103,617,427 bp
Band	1p21.1	End	103,625,780 bp

Gene location (Mouse)
Chr.	Chromosome 3 (mouse)
Band	3 F3|3 49.35 cM	Start	113,349,359 bp
Band	3 F3|3 49.35 cM	End	113,400,348 bp
RNA expression pattern
Bgee	Human / Mouse (ortholog); Top expressed in: body of pancreas; islet of Langerhans; duodenum; testicle; nucleus accumbens; fundus; ectocervix; putamen; caudate nucleus; right lobe of liver / Top expressed in: parotid gland; lacrimal gland; submandibular gland; intercostal muscle; left lobe of liver; white adipose tissue; neural layer of retina; tunica adventitia of aorta; subcutaneous adipose tissue; lactiferous gland; More reference expression data
BioGPS	n/a
Gene ontology
Molecular function	chloride ion binding; calcium ion binding; catalytic activity; alpha-amylase activity; hydrolase activity; metal ion binding; hydrolase activity, acting on glycosyl bonds; cation binding
Cellular component	extracellular region; extracellular exosome; extracellular space
Biological process	carbohydrate catabolic process; polysaccharide digestion; metabolism; carbohydrate metabolic process
Sources:Amigo / QuickGO
Orthologs
Databases	NCBI: entry; OMA: entry
Species	Human	Mouse
Entrez	279	11722
Ensembl	ENSG00000243480	ENSMUSG00000074264
UniProt	P04746	P00687
RefSeq (mRNA)	NM_000699	NM_001110505; NM_007446
RefSeq (protein)	NP_000690	NP_001103975; NP_031472
Location (UCSC)	Chr 1: 103.62 – 103.63 Mb	Chr 3: 113.35 – 113.4 Mb
PubMed search
- Wikidata
View/Edit Human	View/Edit Mouse

Alpha-amylase 2A is a digestive enzyme that in humans is encoded by the AMY2A gene. This enzyme functions to break down carbohydrates and especially starch. The enzymes AMY2A and AMY2B (sometimes collectively called AMY2) are the primary alpha-amylases secreted by the acinar cells of the pancreas into pancreatic juice, which is released into the duodenum (the first segment of the small intestines).

== Function ==
Amylases are secreted proteins that hydrolyze 1,4-alpha-glucoside bonds in oligosaccharides and polysaccharides, and thus catalyze the first step in digestion of dietary starch and glycogen. The human genome has a cluster of several amylase genes that are expressed at high levels in either salivary gland (AMY1A, AMY1B, AMY1C) or pancreas (AMY2A, AMY2B). This gene encodes an amylase isoenzyme produced by the pancreas. Like the saliva AMY1 enzymes, the number of AMY2-encoding genes varies from individual to individual, however the AMY2A and AMY2B proteins are ~99% similar but not identical.

== See also ==
- AMY1A
