= Amylase =

Class of enzymes

Alpha-amylase
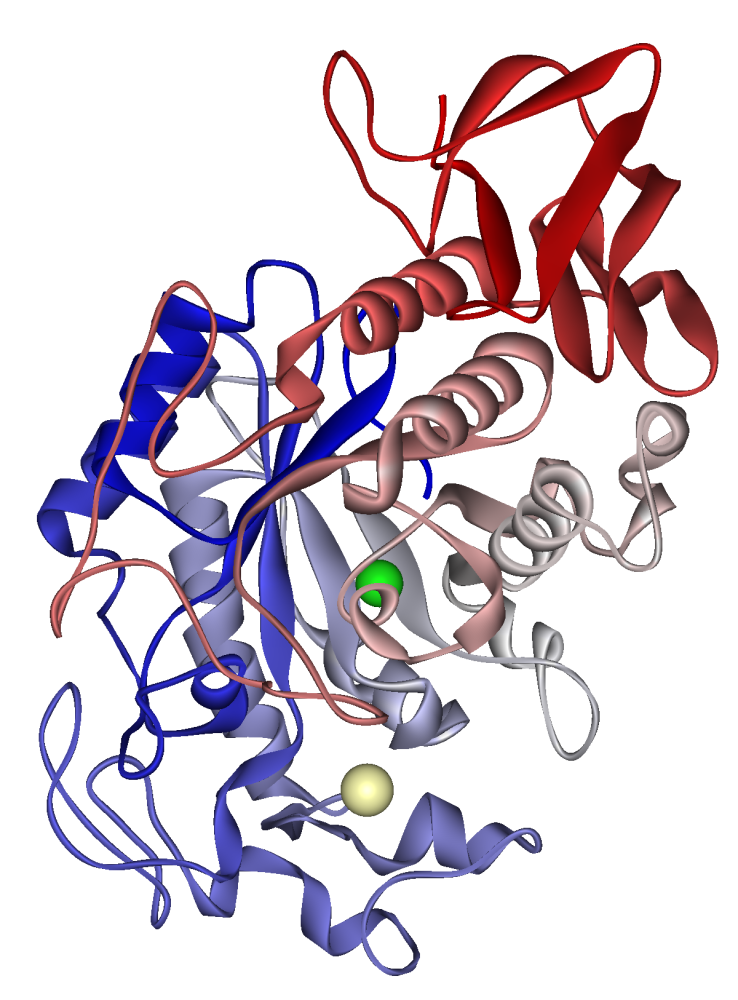
- Human salivary amylase: calcium ion visible in pale khaki, chloride ion in green. PDB 1SMD

Identifiers
- EC no.: 3.2.1.1
- CAS no.: 9000-90-2

Databases
- BRENDA: enzyme data
- ExPASy: NiceZyme view
- KEGG: enzyme entry
- MetaCyc: metabolic pathway
- Rhea: reactions
- PDB structures: RCSB PDB PDBe PDBsum
- Gene Ontology: AmiGO / QuickGO
Search
- PMC: articles
- PubMed: articles
- NCBI: proteins

Beta-amylase
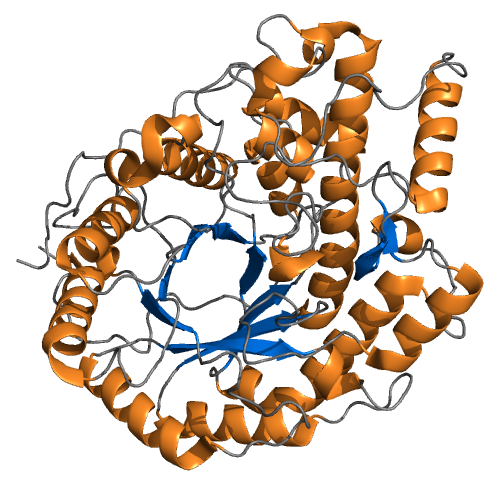
- Structure of barley beta-amylase. PDB 2xfr

Identifiers
- EC no.: 3.2.1.2
- CAS no.: 9000-91-3

Databases
- BRENDA: enzyme data
- ExPASy: NiceZyme view
- KEGG: enzyme entry
- MetaCyc: metabolic pathway
- Rhea: reactions
- PDB structures: RCSB PDB PDBe PDBsum
- Gene Ontology: AmiGO / QuickGO
Search
- PMC: articles
- PubMed: articles
- NCBI: proteins

Gamma-amylase. Glucan 1,4-alpha-glucosidase

Identifiers
- EC no.: 3.2.1.3
- CAS no.: 9032-08-0

Databases
- BRENDA: enzyme data
- ExPASy: NiceZyme view
- KEGG: enzyme entry
- MetaCyc: metabolic pathway
- Rhea: reactions
- PDB structures: RCSB PDB PDBe PDBsum
- Gene Ontology: AmiGO / QuickGO
Search
- PMC: articles
- PubMed: articles
- NCBI: proteins

An amylase (/ˈæmɪleɪs/) is an enzyme that catalyses the hydrolysis of starch (Latin amylum) into sugars. Amylase is present in the saliva of humans and some other mammals, where it begins the chemical process of digestion. Foods that contain large amounts of starch but little sugar, such as rice and potatoes, may acquire a sweet taste as they are chewed because amylase degrades some of their starch into sugar. The pancreas and salivary glands make amylase (alpha amylase) to hydrolyse dietary starch into disaccharides and trisaccharides, which are converted by other enzymes to glucose to supply the body with energy. Plants and some bacteria also produce amylase. Specific amylase proteins are designated by different Greek letters. All amylases are glycoside hydrolases and act on α-1,4-glycosidic bonds.

== Classification ==
	α-amylase	β-amylase	γ-amylase
Source	Animals, plants, microbes	Plants, microbes	Animals, microbes
Tissue	Salivary gland, pancreas	Seeds, fruits	Small intestine
Cleavage site	Random α-1,4 glycosidic bond	Second α-1,4 glycosidic bond	Last α-1,4 glycosidic bond
Reaction products	Maltose, dextrin, etc.	Maltose	Glucose
Optimum pH	6.7–7.0	5.4–5.5	4.0–4.5
Optimum temperature in brewing	68–74 °C (154–165 °F)	58–65 °C (136–149 °F)	63–68 °C (145–154 °F)

=== α-Amylase ===
The α-amylases (EC 3.2.1.1 ) (CAS 9014–71–5) (alternative names: 1,4-α-D-glucan glucanohydrolase; glycogenase) are calcium metalloenzymes. By acting at random locations along the starch chain, α-amylase breaks down long-chain saccharides, ultimately yielding either maltotriose and maltose from amylose; or maltose, glucose, and "limit dextrin" from amylopectin. They belong to glycoside hydrolase family 13 (CAZY GH_13).

Because it can act anywhere on the substrate, α-amylase tends to be faster-acting than β-amylase. In animals, it is a major digestive enzyme, and its optimum pH is 6.7–7.0.

In human physiology, both the salivary (AMY1A, AMY1B, AMY1C) and pancreatic (AMY2A, AMY2B) amylases are α-amylases.

The α-amylase form is also found in plants, fungi (ascomycetes and basidiomycetes), and bacteria (Bacillus).

=== β-Amylase ===
Another form of amylase, β-amylase (EC 3.2.1.2 ) (alternative names: 1,4-α-D-glucan maltohydrolase; glycogenase; saccharogen amylase) is also synthesized by bacteria, fungi, and plants. Working from the non-reducing end, β-amylase catalyzes the hydrolysis of the second α-1,4 glycosidic bond, cleaving off two glucose units (maltose) at a time. During the ripening of fruit, β-amylase breaks starch into maltose, resulting in the sweet flavor of ripe fruit. They belong to glycoside hydrolase family 14.

Both α-amylase and β-amylase are present in seeds: β-amylase is present in an inactive form prior to germination, whereas α-amylase and proteases appear once germination has begun. Many microbes produce amylase to degrade extracellular starches. Animal tissues do not contain β-amylase, although it may be present in microorganisms contained within the digestive tract. The optimum pH for β-amylase is 4.0–5.0.

=== γ-amylase ===
γ-Amylase (EC 3.2.1.3 ) (alternative names: Glucan 1,4-α-glucosidase; amyloglucosidase; exo-1,4-α-glucosidase; glucoamylase; lysosomal α-glucosidase; 1,4-α-D-glucan glucohydrolase) will cleave α(1–6) glycosidic linkages, as well as the last α-1,4 glycosidic bond at the nonreducing end of amylose and amylopectin, yielding glucose. The γ-amylase has the most acidic optimum pH of all amylases, because it is most active around pH 3. They belong to a variety of different glycoside hydrolase families, such as glycoside hydrolase family 15 in fungi, glycoside hydrolase family 31 of human MGAM, and glycoside hydrolase family 97 of bacterial forms.

== Uses ==
=== Fermentation ===
α- and β-amylases are important in brewing beer and liquor made from sugars derived from starch. In fermentation, yeast ingests sugars and excretes ethanol. In beer and some liquors, the sugars present at the beginning of fermentation have been produced by "mashing" grains or other starch sources (such as potatoes). In traditional beer brewing, malted barley is mixed with hot water to create a "mash", which is held at a given temperature to allow the amylases in the malted grain to convert the barley's starch into sugars. Different temperatures optimize the activity of alpha or beta amylase, resulting in different mixtures of fermentable and unfermentable sugars. In selecting mash temperature and grain-to-water ratio, a brewer can change the alcohol content, mouthfeel, aroma, and flavor of the finished beer.

In some historic methods of producing alcoholic beverages, the conversion of starch to sugar starts with the brewer chewing grain to mix it with saliva. This practice continues to be practiced in home production of some traditional drinks, such as chhaang in the Himalayas, chicha in the Andes and kasiri in Brazil and Suriname.

=== Flour additive ===
Amylases are used in breadmaking and to break down complex sugars, such as starch (found in flour), into simple sugars. Yeast then feeds on these simple sugars and converts it into the waste products of ethanol and carbon dioxide. This imparts flavour and causes the bread to rise. While amylases are found naturally in yeast cells, it takes time for the yeast to produce enough of these enzymes to break down significant quantities of starch in the bread. This is the reason for long fermented doughs such as sourdough. Modern breadmaking techniques have included amylases (often in the form of malted barley) into bread improver, thereby making the process faster and more practical for commercial use.

α-Amylase is often listed as an ingredient on commercially package-milled flour. Bakers with long exposure to amylase-enriched flour are at risk of developing dermatitis or asthma.

=== Molecular biology ===
In molecular biology, the presence of amylase can serve as an additional method of selecting for successful integration of a reporter construct in addition to antibiotic resistance. As reporter genes are flanked by homologous regions of the structural gene for amylase, successful integration will disrupt the amylase gene and prevent starch degradation, which is easily detectable through iodine staining.

=== Medical uses ===
Amylase also has medical applications in the use of pancreatic enzyme replacement therapy (PERT). It is one of the components in Sollpura (liprotamase) to help in the breakdown of saccharides into simple sugars.

=== Scientific uses ===
Salivary alpha-amylase serves as a biomarker for physiological stress. In response to sympathetic nervous system activity (for example due to a real-life stressor), the level of alpha-amylase in the saliva is known to increase; therefore, the amount of alpha-amylase in the saliva can inform researchers specifically about the sympathetic nervous system activity component of the stress response. Like with other biomarkers for stress, it is known that the salivary alpha-amylase response to stress is reduced in intensity in people with occupational burnout.

=== Other uses ===
An inhibitor of alpha-amylase, called phaseolamin, has been tested as a potential diet aid.

When used as a food additive, amylase has E number E1100, and may be derived from pig pancreas or mold fungi.

Bacilliary amylase is also used in clothing and dishwasher detergents to dissolve starches from fabrics and dishes.

Factory workers who work with amylase for any of the above uses are at increased risk of occupational asthma. Five to nine percent of bakers have a positive skin test, and a fourth to a third of bakers with breathing problems are hypersensitive to amylase.

== Hyperamylasemia ==
Blood serum amylase may be measured for purposes of medical diagnosis. A higher than normal concentration may reflect any of several medical conditions, including acute inflammation of the pancreas (which may be measured concurrently with the more specific lipase), perforated peptic ulcer, torsion of an ovarian cyst, strangulation, ileus, mesenteric ischemia, macroamylasemia and mumps. Amylase may be measured in other body fluids, including urine and peritoneal fluid.

A January 2007 study from Washington University in St. Louis suggests that saliva tests of the enzyme could be used to indicate sleep deficits, as the enzyme increases its activity in correlation with the length of time a subject has been deprived of sleep.

== History ==
In 1831, Erhard Friedrich Leuchs (1800–1837) described the hydrolysis of starch by saliva, due to the presence of an enzyme in saliva, "ptyalin", an amylase. It was named after the Ancient Greek name for saliva: πτύαλον - ptyalon.

The modern history of enzymes began in 1833, when French chemists Anselme Payen and Jean-François Persoz isolated an amylase complex from germinating barley and named it "diastase". It is from this term that all subsequent enzyme names tend to end in the suffix -ase.

In 1862, Russian biochemist Aleksandr Yakovlevich Danilevsky (1838–1923) separated pancreatic amylase from trypsin.

== Evolution ==
=== Salivary amylase ===
Saccharides are a food source rich in energy. Large polymers such as starch are partially hydrolyzed in the mouth by the enzyme amylase before being cleaved further into sugars. Many mammals have seen great expansions in the copy number of the amylase gene. These duplications allow for the pancreatic amylase AMY2 to re-target to the salivary glands, allowing animals to detect starch by taste and to digest starch more efficiently and in higher quantities. This has happened independently in mice, rats, dogs, pigs, and most importantly, humans after the agricultural revolution.

Following the agricultural revolution 12,000 years ago, human diet began to shift more to plant and animal domestication in place of hunting and gathering. Starch has become a staple of the human diet.

Despite the obvious benefits, early humans did not possess salivary amylase, a trend that is also seen in evolutionary relatives of the human, such as chimpanzees and bonobos, who possess either one or no copies of the gene responsible for producing salivary amylase.

Like in other mammals, the pancreatic alpha-amylase AMY2 was duplicated multiple times. One event allowed it to evolve salivary specificity, leading to the production of amylase in the saliva (named in humans as AMY1). The 1p21.1 region of human chromosome 1 contains many copies of these genes, variously named AMY1A, AMY1B, AMY1C, AMY2A, AMY2B, and so on.

However, not all humans possess the same number of copies of the AMY1 gene. Populations known to rely more on saccharides have a higher number of AMY1 copies than human populations that, by comparison, consume little starch. The number of AMY1 gene copies in humans can range from six copies in agricultural groups such as European-American and Japanese (two high starch populations) to only two to three copies in hunter-gatherer societies such as the Biaka, Datog, and Yakuts.

The correlation that exists between starch consumption and number of AMY1 copies specific to population suggest that more AMY1 copies in high starch populations has been selected for by natural selection and considered the favorable phenotype for those individuals. Therefore, it is most likely that the benefit of an individual possessing more copies of AMY1 in a high starch population increases fitness and produces healthier, fitter offspring.

This fact is especially apparent when comparing geographically close populations with different eating habits that possess a different number of copies of the AMY1 gene. Such is the case for some Asian populations that have been shown to possess few AMY1 copies relative to some agricultural populations in Asia. This offers strong evidence that natural selection has acted on this gene as opposed to the possibility that the gene has spread through genetic drift.

Variations of amylase copy number in dogs mirrors that of human populations, suggesting they acquired the extra copies as they followed humans around. Unlike humans whose amylase levels depend on starch content in diet, wild animals eating a broad range of foods tend to have more copies of amylase. This may have to do with mainly detection of starch as opposed to digestion.
