= Β-Amylase =

Enzyme that hydrolyses alpha-1,4-D-glucosidic bonds in polysaccharides

β-amylase
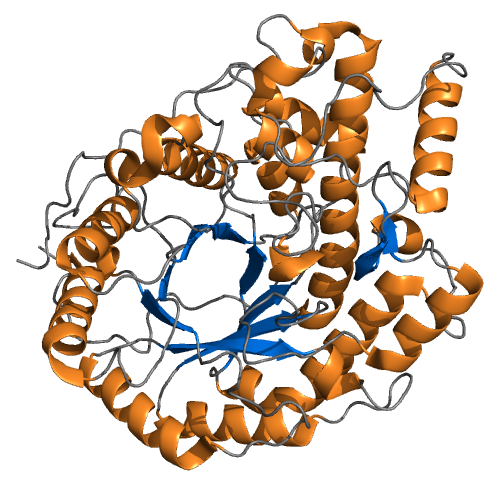
- Structure of barley beta-amylase. PDB 2xfr

Identifiers
- EC no.: 3.2.1.2
- CAS no.: 9000-91-3

Databases
- BRENDA: enzyme data
- ExPASy: NiceZyme view
- KEGG: enzyme entry
- MetaCyc: metabolic pathway
- Rhea: reactions
- PDB structures: RCSB PDB PDBe PDBsum
- Gene Ontology: AmiGO / QuickGO
Search
- PMC: articles
- PubMed: articles
- NCBI: proteins

β-Amylase (EC 3.2.1.2, saccharogen amylase, glycogenase) is an enzyme with the systematic name 4-α-D-glucan maltohydrolase. It catalyses the following reaction:

Hydrolysis of (1→4)-α-D-glucosidic linkages in polysaccharides so as to remove successive maltose units from the non-reducing ends of the chains

This enzyme acts on starch, glycogen and related polysaccharides and oligosaccharides producing beta-maltose by an inversion. Beta-amylase is found in bacteria, fungi, and plants; bacteria and cereal sources are the most heat stable. Working from the non-reducing end, β-amylase catalyzes the hydrolysis of the second α-1,4 glycosidic bond, cleaving off two glucose units (maltose) at a time. During the ripening of fruit, β-amylase breaks starch into maltose, resulting in the sweet flavor of ripe fruit.

β-amylase is present in an inactive form prior to seed germination. Many microbes also produce amylase to degrade extracellular starches. Animal tissues do not contain β-amylase, although it may be present in microorganisms contained within the digestive tract. The optimum pH for β-amylase is 4.0–5.0 They belong to glycoside hydrolase family 14.

The substrate spectrum for beta-amylase is:

1. Polysaccharides containing alpha-(1-4)-linked D-glucose units + H2O (specific for alpha-(1-4)-linkages, requirements for non-reducing chain end)
2. Starch + H2O
3. Amylopectin + H2O
4. Glycogen
5. Amylose + H2O
6. Alpha-D-glucopyranosyl-(1-4)-2-deoxy-D-glucal (maltal)

Inhibitors include Glucose, Maltose (competitive), Alpha-methyl-glucoside, Cyclodextrins (e.g. cyclohexaamylose), o-Iodosobenzoate, Ag^{+}, Hg^{2+}, Cu^{2+}, N-Ethylmaleimide, p-Chloromercuribenzoate (reversed by DTT or mercaptoethanol, reversed by glutathione), Pb^{2+}, Ni^{2+}, Cd^{2+}, Fe^{3+}, Zn^{2+}, Mn^{2+}, Mg^{2+}, EDTA, Beta-amylase inhibitor (from Streptomyces sp. No. 54), K_{2}PtCl_{6}, K_{2}PtCl_{4}, K_{2}IrCl_{6}, Na_{2}PdCl_{6}, CO_{3}^{2-}, and Iodoacetamide.

== See also ==
- Amylase
- Alpha-amylase
