= Α-Amylase =

Enzyme that hydrolyses α bonds of large α-linked polysaccharides

α-Amylase
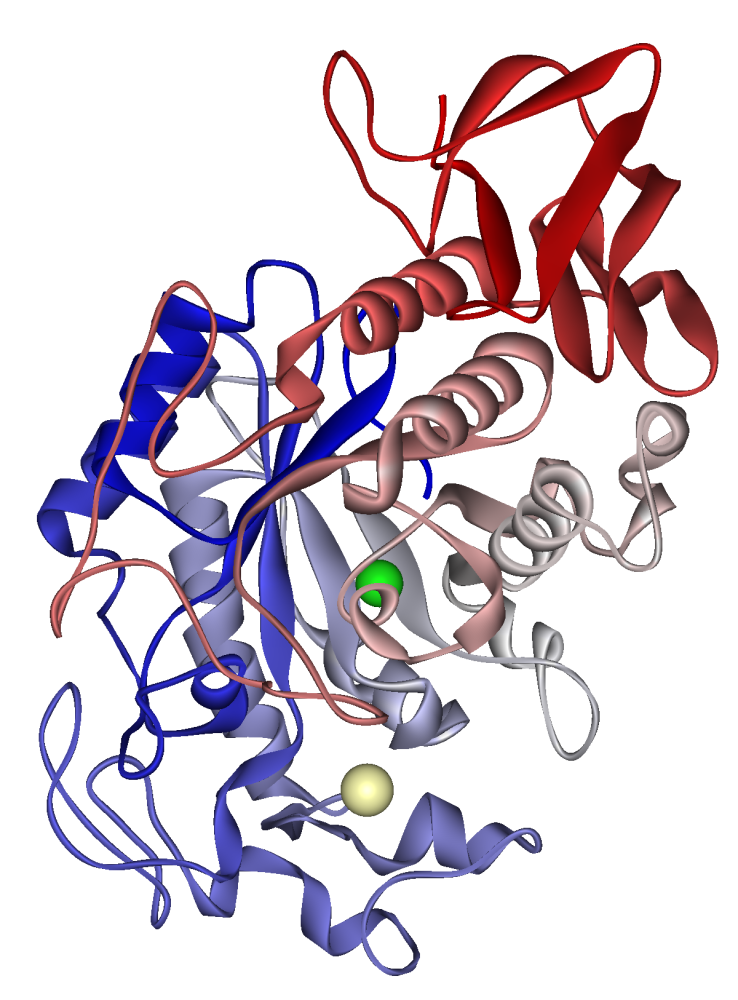
- Human salivary amylase: calcium ion visible in pale khaki, chloride ion in green. PDB 1SMD

Identifiers
- EC no.: 3.2.1.1
- CAS no.: 9000-90-2

Databases
- BRENDA: enzyme data
- ExPASy: NiceZyme view
- KEGG: enzyme entry
- MetaCyc: metabolic pathway
- Rhea: reactions
- PDB structures: RCSB PDB PDBe PDBsum
Search
- PMC: articles
- PubMed: articles
- NCBI: proteins

GH13 catalytic domain
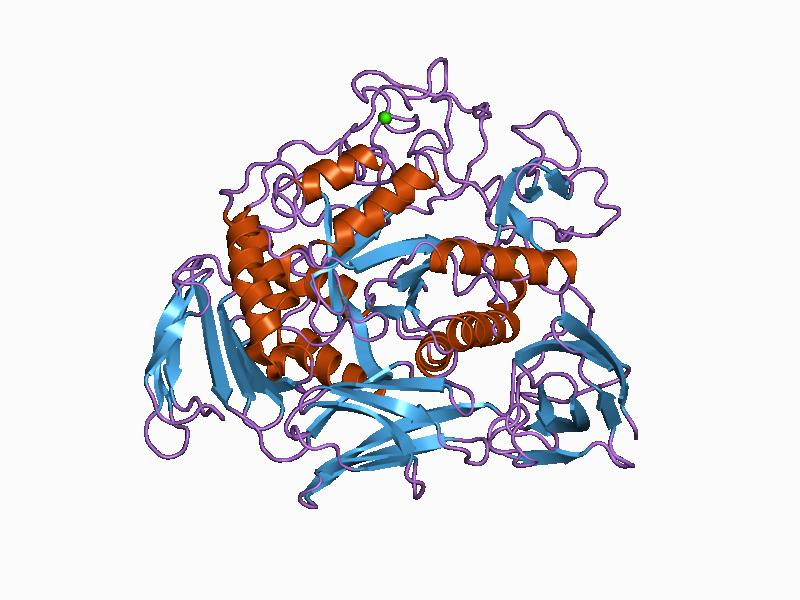
- Cyclodextrin glucanotransferase (e.c.2.4.1.19) (cgtase)

Identifiers
- Symbol: Alpha-amylase
- Pfam: PF00128
- Pfam clan: CL0058
- InterPro: IPR006047
- SCOP2: 1ppi / SCOPe / SUPFAM
- OPM superfamily: 117
- OPM protein: 1wza
- CAZy: GH13
- CDD: cd11338
Available protein structures:
- PDB: IPR006047 PF00128 (ECOD; PDBsum)
- AlphaFold: IPR006047; PF00128

Alpha-amylase C-terminal beta-sheet domain
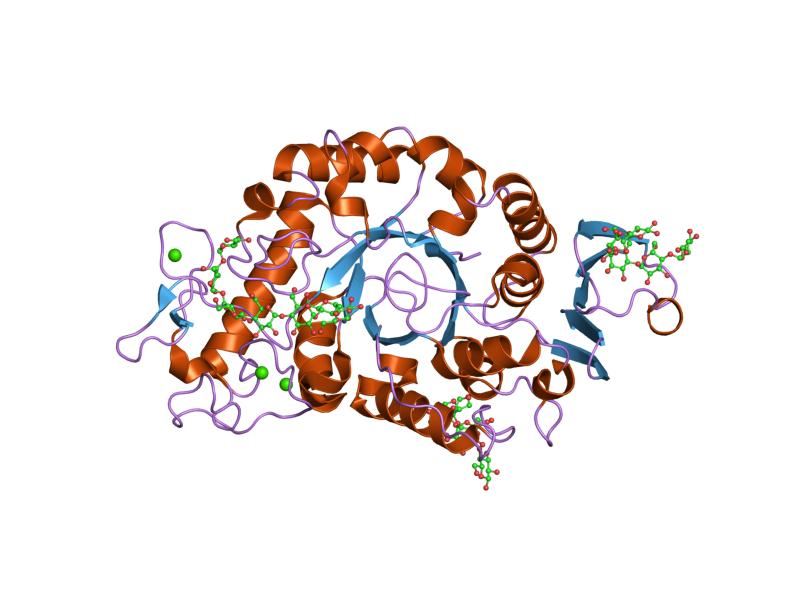
- Crystal structure of barley alpha-amylase isozyme 1 (amy1) inactive mutant d180a in complex with maltoheptaose

Identifiers
- Symbol: Alpha-amyl_C2
- Pfam: PF07821
- InterPro: IPR012850
Available protein structures:
- PDB: IPR012850 PF07821 (ECOD; PDBsum)
- AlphaFold: IPR012850; PF07821

Alpha amylase, C-terminal all-beta domain
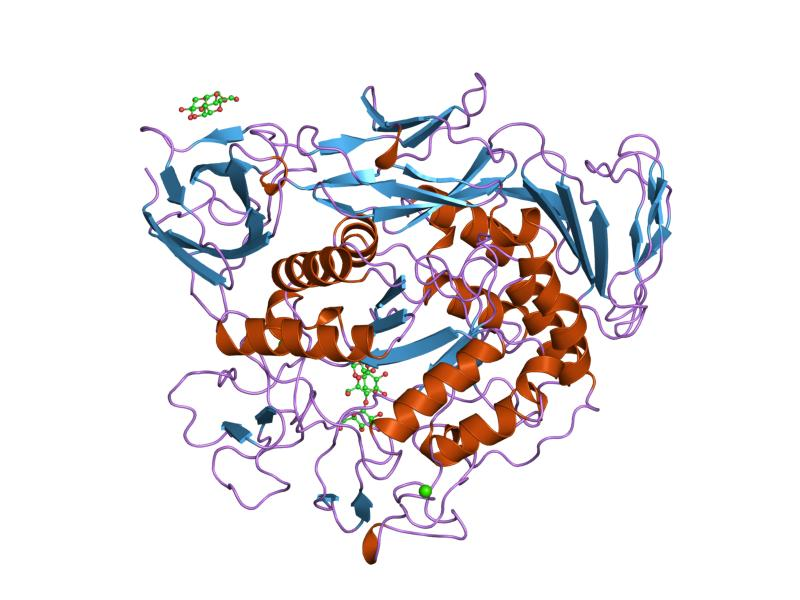
- maltotriose complex of preconditioned cyclodextrin glycosyltransferase mutant

Identifiers
- Symbol: Alpha-amylase_C
- Pfam: PF02806
- Pfam clan: CL0369
- InterPro: IPR006048
- SCOP2: 1ppi / SCOPe / SUPFAM
Available protein structures:
- PDB: IPR006048 PF02806 (ECOD; PDBsum)
- AlphaFold: IPR006048; PF02806

α-Amylase is an enzyme (EC 3.2.1.1; systematic name 4-α-D-glucan glucanohydrolase (Note: Other names include Glycogenase, Endoamylase, Taka-amylase A, Amylase, .alpha.-, Buclamase, Fortizyme, Amylopsin, Maxilase, Amylase THC 250, Maxamyl, Thermamyl, Ptyalin, Clarase, Bactosol TK, Spitase CP 1, Takatherm, Pivozin, Thermolase, Kleistase L 1, G 995, Fungamyl 800L, Termamyl, and Amylotherm.)) that hydrolyses α bonds of large, α-linked polysaccharides, such as starch and glycogen, yielding shorter chains thereof, dextrins, and maltose, through the following biochemical process:

Endohydrolysis of (1→4)-α-D-glucosidic linkages in polysaccharides containing three or more (1→4)-α-linked D-glucose units

It is the major form of amylase found in humans and other mammals. It is also present in seeds containing starch as a food reserve, and is secreted by many fungi. It is a member of glycoside hydrolase family 13.

== In human biology ==
Although found in many tissues, amylase is most prominent in pancreatic juice and saliva, each of which has its own isoform of human α-amylase. They behave differently on isoelectric focusing, and can also be separated in testing by using specific monoclonal antibodies. In humans, all amylase isoforms link to chromosome 1p21 (see AMY1A).

=== Salivary amylase (ptyalin) ===
Amylase is found in saliva and breaks starch into maltose and dextrin. This form of amylase is also called "ptyalin" /ˈtaɪəlɪn/, which was named by chemist Jöns Jacob Berzelius. The name derives from the Greek word πτυω (I spit), because the substance was obtained from saliva. It will break large, insoluble starch molecules into soluble starches (amylodextrin, erythrodextrin, and achrodextrin) producing successively smaller starches and ultimately maltose. Ptyalin acts on linear α(1,4) glycosidic linkages, but compound hydrolysis requires an enzyme that acts on branched products. Salivary amylase is inactivated in the stomach by gastric acid. In gastric juice adjusted to pH 3.3, ptyalin was totally inactivated in 20 minutes at 37 °C. In contrast, 50% of amylase activity remained after 150 minutes of exposure to gastric juice at pH 4.3. Both starch, the substrate for ptyalin, and the product (short chains of glucose) are able to partially protect it against inactivation by gastric acid. Ptyalin added to buffer at pH 3.0 underwent complete inactivation in 120 minutes; however, addition of starch at a 0.1% level resulted in 10% of the activity remaining, and similar addition of starch to a 1.0% level resulted in about 40% of the activity remaining at 120 minutes.

==== Optimum conditions for ptyalin ====
Optimum pH – 7.0; 5.6-6.9
Human body temperature - 37 degrees Celsius
Presence of certain anions and activators:

Chloride and bromide – most effective
Iodide – less effective
Sulfate and phosphate – least effective

=== Genetic variation in human salivary amylase ===
The salivary amylase gene has undergone duplication during evolution, and DNA hybridization studies indicate many individuals have multiple tandem repeats of the gene. The number of gene copies correlates with the levels of salivary amylase, as measured by protein blot assays using antibodies to human amylase. Gene copy number is associated with apparent evolutionary exposure to high-starch diets. For example, a Japanese individual had 14 copies of the amylase gene (one allele with 10 copies, and a second allele with four copies). The Japanese diet has traditionally contained large amounts of rice starch. In contrast, a Biaka individual carried six copies (three copies on each allele). The Biaka are rainforest hunter-gatherers who have traditionally consumed a low-starch diet. Perry and colleagues speculated the increased copy number of the salivary amylase gene may have enhanced survival coincident to a shift to a starchy diet during human evolution.

=== Pancreatic amylase ===
Pancreatic α-amylase randomly cleaves the α(1-4) glycosidic linkages of amylose to yield dextrin, maltose, or maltotriose. It adopts a double displacement mechanism with retention of anomeric configuration. Two very similar forms of the enzyme are produced in humans, AMY2A and AMY2B, which are found in roughly equal quantities in pancreatic juice (produced by acinar cells). In humans, the salivary amylase is thought to have evolved from a copy of one of the pancreatic amylase genes.

=== In pathology ===
The test for amylase is easier to perform than that for lipase, making it the primary test used to detect and monitor pancreatitis. Medical laboratories will usually measure either pancreatic amylase or total amylase. If only pancreatic amylase is measured, an increase will not be noted with mumps or other salivary gland trauma.

However, because of the small amount present, timing is critical when sampling blood for this measurement. Blood should be taken soon after a bout of pancreatitis pain, otherwise it is excreted rapidly by the kidneys.

Salivary α-amylase has been used as a biomarker for stress and as a surrogate marker of sympathetic nervous system (SNS) activity that does not require a blood draw.

==== Interpretation ====
Increased plasma levels in humans are found in:

- Salivary trauma (including anaesthetic intubation)
- Mumps – due to inflammation of the salivary glands
- Pancreatitis – because of damage to the cells that produce amylase
- Kidney failure – due to reduced excretion

Total amylase readings of over 10 times the upper limit of normal (ULN) are suggestive of pancreatitis. Five to 10 times the ULN may indicate ileus or duodenal disease or kidney failure, and lower elevations are commonly found in salivary gland disease.

=== Genes ===
- salivary – AMY1A, AMY1B, AMY1C
- pancreatic – AMY2A, AMY2B

== In grain ==
α-Amylase activity in grain is measured by, for instance, the Hagberg–Perten Falling Number, a test to assess sprout damages, or the Phadebas method. It occurs in wheat.

== Industrial use ==
α-Amylase is used in ethanol production to break starches in grains into fermentable sugars.

The first step in the production of high-fructose corn syrup is the treatment of cornstarch with α-amylase, which cleaves the long starch polymers into shorter chains of oligosaccharides.

An α-amylase called "Termamyl", sourced from Bacillus licheniformis, is also used in some detergents, especially dishwashing and starch-removing detergents.

See amylase for more uses of the amylase family in general.

== Potential for medical use ==
α-Amylase has exhibited efficacy in degrading polymicrobial bacterial biofilms by hydrolyzing the α(1→4) glycosidic linkages within the structural, matrix exopolysaccharides of the extracellular polymeric substance (EPS).

== Disease and health relevance ==
- Diabetes: α-glucosidase and α-amylase inhibitors are found in several raw plants/herbs such as cinnamon and bacteria containing acarbose They are used as anti-diabetic drugs. The intake of a single dose of before a meal containing complex carbohydrates clearly suppresses the glucose spike and may decrease the postprandial hyperglycemia (higher than 140 mg/dL; >7.8 mmol/L) in patients with type II diabetes.

== Buffer inhibition ==
The tris molecule is reported to inhibit a number of bacterial α-amylases, so they should not be used in tris buffer.

== Determination ==
Several methods are available for determination of α-amylase activity, and different industries tend to rely on different methods. The starch iodine test, a development of the iodine test, is based on colour change, as α-amylase degrades starch and is commonly used in many applications. A similar but industrially produced test is the Phadebas amylase test, which is used as a qualitative and quantitative test within many industries, such as detergents, various flour, grain, and malt foods, and forensic biology.

Modified colorimetric microdetermination of amylase is described in which the digestion of starch is measured by the decrease in the starch-iodine color.

== Domain architecture ==
α-Amylases contain a number of distinct protein domains. The catalytic domain has a structure consisting of an eight-stranded α/β barrel that contains the active site, interrupted by a ~70-amino acid calcium-binding domain protruding between β-strand 3 and α-helix 3, and a carboxyl-terminal Greek key β-barrel domain. Several α-amylases contain a β-sheet domain, usually at the C terminus. This domain is organised as a five-stranded antiparallel β-sheet. Several α-amylases contain an all-β domain, usually at the C terminus.

== Substrate Spectrum and Inhibitors ==
The substrate spectrum includes

1. starch + H2O (soluble, raw, specific for alpha-1(1-4) linkages, exception: Thermoactinomyces vulgaris, hydrolysis of alpha-(1-4)-and alpha-(1-6)-linkages)
2. Amylose + H2O
3. Amylopectin + H2O
4. Glycogen + H2O
5. Beta-limit dextrin + H2O
6. p-Nitrophenylmaltoheptaoside
7. p-Nitrophenyl-alpha-D-maltoside + H2O
8. Phenyl-3'-O-methyl-alpha-maltoside + H2O (and similar substrates)
9. Isopanose + H2O
10. Pullulan + H2O
11. More (cereal amylase: fast hydrolysis of high MW substrates, mammalian amylase: fast hydrolysis of large and small MW substrates, classification according to saccharifying and liquifying type, preference of maltodextrins with small MW, and no transferase).

Inhibitors include Hg2+, Cu2+, Pb2+, Mg2+, Co2+, Ca2+, Cs2+, Rb2+, Fe3+, Zn2+, Al3+, Cd2+, Fe2+, Ni2+, Ba2+, Iodoacetate (not: hog pancreas), Phenylmercuric chloride, Ammonium molybdate, Ascorbic acid, Iodoacetamide, 2,4-Fluorodinitrobenzene, 2, 4-Dinitrobenzene-1-sulfonate, EGTA, Phenylmercuric acetate, and p-Choromercuribenzoate.

== See also ==
- Alpha-glucosidase inhibitor
- Acarbose
- Cinnamon
- Digestive enzyme
