= Libfix =

Type of affix

In linguistics, a libfix (from "liberated affix") is a productive bound morpheme affix created by rebracketing and back-formation, often a generalization of a component of a blended or portmanteau word. For example, walkathon was coined in 1932 as a blend of walk and marathon, and soon thereafter the -athon part was reinterpreted as a libfix meaning "event or activity lasting a long time or involving a great deal of something". Words formed with this suffix include talkathon, telethon, hackathon, and so on. Affixes whose morpheme boundaries are etymologically based, and which are used in their original sense, are not libfixes. Libfixes often utilise epenthesis, as in the example of -holism and -holic which are joined with consonant-final segments via the vowel ⟨a⟩, creating work-a-holism or sex-a-holism.

== History ==
Splinters were defined by Berman in 1961 as non-morphemic word fragments. This includes not just libfixes, but also word fragments which become words, like burger (< hamburger), flu (< influenza), and net (< network).

The name libfix was coined by Arnold Zwicky in 2010 as a blend of "liberated" and "affix" specifically for splinters used as productive morphemes.

== Criticism ==
Some of these formations have been considered barbarisms by prescriptive writers on style, though other writers have praised them. Speaking of the -tron suffix, a philologist commented:

I once heard an unkind critic allude disparagingly to these neologisms as dog-Greek. To a lover of the language of Sophocles and Plato these recent coinages may indeed appear to be Greek debased. More appropriately, perhaps, they might be termed lion-Greek or chameleon-Greek. They are Neo-Hellenic in the genuine Renaissance tradition.

== Examples ==
Each example gives the affix, the source word(s) from which it was formed, the meaning, and examples.

This list does not include:

- affixes based on English words like tech or burger used literally, even if they are shortened forms, in this case, for technology and hamburger;
- affixes which are aligned in form and meaning with their etymological source, like -(o)cracy or -orama in cyclorama and diorama from ὅραμα 'spectacle'; motorama is a portmanteau of motor and orama, not a compound of mot- and -orama;
- words which have been separated from phrases, e.g. fu from kung fu.

=== English ===
==== Suffixes ====
-(i)ana < Virgiliana (Latin, then French)
related to a given person, place, period

Churchilliana, Americana, Victoriana

-ase < diastase
an enzyme

lactase, polymerase

-cation < vacation
kinds of vacation

staycation, girlcation

-copter < helicopter
having a spinning rotor allowing for flight

gyrocopter

-core < hardcore
aesthetic, hardcore punk derivatives, hardcore techno derivatives

speedcore, grindcore, cottagecore, bardcore

-dar < radar
the skill of detecting qualities or things

gaydar, humordar, Jewdar

-erati < literati
groups of people with common interests

digerati, glitterati

-flation < inflation
economic inflation in a particular field

tipflation, stagflation, shrinkflation

-gasm < orgasm
an intensely pleasurable experience

foodgasm, cargasm, shoegasm, nerdgasm

-gate < Watergate
a scandal

gamergate, troopergate; see List of "-gate" scandals

-(m)(a)geddon < Armageddon
major disasters (usually facetious)

carmageddon, snowgeddon, Irmageddon

-(a)holic, -(a)holism < Alcoholism
addict(ed)

shopaholic, workaholic, sexaholic; see English terms suffixed with -holic

-kini < bikini
type of bathing suit

burkini, monokini, tankini, mankini

-(i/e/a/∅)licious < delicious
a high degree of some property (usually jocular)

bootylicious, babelicious, yummalicious, sacrilicious, crunchalicious

-(o)nomics < economics
an economic policy or philosophy

Reaganomics, freakonomics

-ola < pianola, tombola (?)
used to form commercial products; later, for forms of bribery

Victrola, moviola, shinola; payola, plugola

-oma < carcinoma, sarcoma (-ομα is a suffix for deverbal nouns)
a kind of tumor, swelling, or cancer

melanoma, adenoma, papilloma

-ome, -omics < genome, genomics, trichome
a map of a biological system; and other uses in biology

connectome, proteome; biome, rhizome, vacuome

-on < electron (see also -tron)
an elementary particle or quasiparticle

proton, neutron, meson, phonon, etc.; see List of particles

-preneur < entrepreneur
an entrepreneur in some domain

intrapreneur, ecopreneur, mompreneur

-pocalypse < apocalypse
a catastrophic event

snowpocalypse, robopocalypse, beepocalypse

-tard < retard, a pejorative term for a mentally disabled or stupid person
people who are foolish or stupid; pejorative

fucktard, libtard

-(a)thon, -a-thon < marathon
that last a long time or require remarkable endurance

walkathon, telethon, hackathon

-tron < electron
a kind of vacuum tube; a subatomic particle; a device

magnetron; positron; cyclotron

-(n)(i)verse < universe
the collection of all things in a category, or a fictional universe

blogoverse, Twitterverse, Whoniverse

-wich < sandwich
sandwich

fishwich, hamwich, snackwich

-zilla < Godzilla
monstrous, scary, or large things; can function as an augmentative and pejorative

bridezilla, Mozilla

==== Prefixes ====
alt- < alternative (usually written with a hyphen)
outside the mainstream

alt-rock, alt-right

crypto- < cryptography
related to cryptocurrency

cryptoasset, cryptobro, cryptocoin, cryptojack, cryptoverse

cyber- < cybernetics
issues or policies related to computers

cyberspace, cybercrime

eco- < ecology
related to the environment, to ecology, or to sustainability

eco-terrorism, eco-nationalism, eco-investing

econo- < economics
related to economics; economical, inexpensive

econometrics (not *economometrics), econophysics; econobox

franken- < Frankenstein
related to “human efforts to interfere with nature”

frankenfood, frankenplant, frankenscience

glut- < gluten, glutamic acid
related to glutamic acid, one of the amino acids

glutamine, glutamate

heli- < helicopter
types of helicopters; related to helicopters

helibus; helipad, heliport, helidrome, heliborne

hyper- < hypertext
related to hypertext

hyperlink, hypermedia

oxy-, oxi- < oxygen, not sharp, acid
related to oxygen

oxytocin, oximeter, oxycodone

petro- < petroleum, not rock
related to petroleum

petrodollar, petrochemical, petrocurrency

syn- < synthetic, synthesizer
synthetic; related to (musical) synthesizers

syngas, synfuel, syncrude, Synclavier

=== Italian ===
==== Suffix ====
-opoli < Tangentopoli 'Bribesville'
a scandal

Bancopoli, Calciopoli

=== Portuguese (Brazil) ===
==== Suffix ====
-ão < Mensalão 'Monthly payment-gate'
a scandal

Petrolão, Metrolão, Trensalão

== Bibliography ==
- Bernard Fradin, "Combining forms, blends, and related phenomena", in Doleschal, Ursula; Thornton, Anna M., eds. (2000). Extragrammatical and marginal morphology. LINCOM studies in theoretical linguistics. Muenchen: LINCOM Europa. ISBN 978-3-89586-590-9. papers from a workshop in Vienna, 1996, p. 11-59 full text
- Otto Jespersen, "Language: Its Nature Development And Origin, by Otto Jespersen—The Project Gutenberg eBook". www.gutenberg.org.
- Norde, Muriel; Sippach, Sarah (November 2019). "Nerdalicious scientainment: A network analysis of English libfixes". Word Structure. 12 (3): 353–384. doi:10.3366/word.2019.0153. ISSN 1750-1245.
- Yuval Pinter, Cassandra L. Jacobs, Max Bittker. "NYTWIT: A Dataset of Novel Words in the New York Times", Proceedings of the 28th International Conference on Computational Linguistics (Barcelona), p. 6509–6515, December 8–13, 2020. full text
- Whitman, Neal (2013-09-17). "A linguistic tour of the best libfixes, from -ana to -zilla". The Week.
- Arnold Zwicky, "Language Log: Playing with your morphology". itre.cis.upenn.edu.
