= English words of Greek origin =

The Greek language has contributed to the English lexicon in five main ways:

- vernacular borrowings, transmitted orally through Vulgar Latin directly into Old English, e.g., 'butter' (butere, from Latin butyrum < βούτυρον), or through French, e.g., 'ochre' (< ὠχρός);
- learned borrowings from classical Greek texts, often via Latin, e.g., 'physics' (< Latin physica < τὰ φυσικά);
- a few borrowings transmitted through other languages, notably Arabic scientific and philosophical writing, e.g., 'alchemy' (< χημεία);
- direct borrowings from Modern Greek, e.g., 'ouzo' (ούζο) or 'doula' (δούλα);
- neologisms (coinages) in post-classical Latin or modern languages using classical Greek roots, e.g., 'telephone' (< τῆλε + φωνή) or a mixture of Greek and other roots, e.g., 'television' (< Greek τῆλε + English vision < Latin visio); these are often shared among the modern European languages, including Modern Greek.

Of these, the neologisms are by far the most numerous.

== Indirect and direct borrowings ==
Since the living Greek and English languages were not in direct contact until modern times, borrowings were necessarily indirect, coming either through Latin (through texts or through French and other vernaculars), or from Ancient Greek texts, not the living spoken language.

=== Vernacular borrowings ===
==== Romance languages ====
Latin freely borrowed words from Greek. Many were passed on to Romance languages then English, usually via French. Some have remained close to the Greek original, e.g., lamp (Latin lampas; Greek λαμπάς). In others, the phonetic and orthographic forms have changed considerably. For instance, place was borrowed into French from Latin platea, itself borrowed from πλατεία (ὁδός), 'broad (street)'. Italian piazza and Spanish plaza are of the same origin and are later borrowings into English.

The word olive comes through the Romance from the Latin olīva, which in turn comes from the archaic Greek elaíwā (ἐλαίϝᾱ). A later Greek word, boútȳron (βούτυρον), became Latin butyrum and eventually English butter.

A large group of early borrowings, again transmitted first through Latin then through various vernaculars, comes from Christian vocabulary:

- chair << καθέδρα (cf. 'cathedra')
- bishop << epískopos (ἐπίσκοπος 'overseer')
- priest << presbýteros (πρεσβύτερος 'elder')

In some cases, the orthography of these words was later changed to reflect the Greek—and Latin—spelling: e.g., quire was respelled choir in the 17th century. Sometimes this was done incorrectly: ache is from a Germanic root; the spelling ache reflects Samuel Johnson's incorrect etymology from ἄχος.

==== Other ====
Exceptionally, church came into Old English as cirice, circe via a West Germanic language. The Greek form was probably kȳriakḗ [oikía] (κυριακή [οἰκία] 'lord's [house]'). In contrast, the Romance languages generally used the Latin words ecclēsia (French église; Italian chiesa; Spanish iglesia) or basilica (Romanian biserica), both borrowed from Greek.

=== Learned borrowings ===
Many more words were borrowed by scholars writing in Medieval and Renaissance Latin. Some words were borrowed in essentially their original meaning, often transmitted through Classical Latin: topic, type, physics, iambic, eta, necromancy, cosmopolite. A few result from scribal errors: encyclopedia < ἐγκύκλιος παιδεία 'the circle of learning' (not a compound in Greek); acne < ἀκνή (erroneous) < ἀκμή 'high point, acme'. Some kept their Latin form, e.g., podium < πόδιον.

Others were borrowed unchanged as technical terms, but with specific, novel meanings:

- telescope < τηλεσκόπος 'far-seeing', refers to an optical instrument for seeing far away rather than a person who can see far into the distance;
- phlogiston < φλογιστόν 'burnt thing', is a supposed fire-making potential rather than something which has been burned, or can be burned; and
- bacterium < βακτήριον 'stick (diminutive)', is a kind of microorganism rather than a small stick or staff.

=== Usage in neologisms ===
But by far the largest Greek contribution to English vocabulary is the huge number of scientific, medical, and technical neologisms that have been coined by compounding Greek roots and affixes to produce novel words which never existed in the Greek language:

- utopia (1516; οὐ 'not' + τόπος 'place')
- zoology (1669; ζῷον + λογία)
- hydrodynamics (1738; ὕδωρ + δυναμικός)
- photography (1834; φῶς + γραφικός)
- entropy (1865; ἐν + τροπή, coined without reference to the Greek words: Ancient ἐντρέπω 'turn, defer', Biblical and Modern (ἐ)ντροπή 'shame')
- oocyte (1895; ᾠόν + κύτος)
- helicobacter (1989; ἕλιξ + βακτήριον)

So it is really the combining forms of Greek roots and affixes that are borrowed, not the words. Neologisms using these elements are coined in all the European languages, and spread to the others freely—including to Modern Greek, where they are considered to be reborrowings. Traditionally, these coinages were constructed using only Greek morphemes, e.g., metamathematics, but increasingly, Greek, Latin, and other morphemes are combined, sometimes using the Greek interfix -ο-. These hybrid words were formerly considered to be 'barbarisms', such as:

- television (τῆλε- 'distant' + Latin vision);
- automobile (αυτό- 'self' + Latin mobilis);
- petroleum (πέτρ- + Latin oleum, itself borrowed from Greek)
- hemoglobin (αἷμ- + Latin globulus)
- bicycle (Latin bi + κύκλος);
- linguist(ic) (Latin lingua + -ιστής + -ικος);
- metalinguistic (μετά + Latin lingua + -ιστής + -ικος);
- homosexual (ὁμο + Latin sexualis);
- speedometer (English speed + -ο- + μέτρον);
- microwave (μικρο- + English wave);
- bigram (Latin bi- + γράμμα 'letter') is generally used in computer science and computational linguistics for any two adjacent items (tokens, words, characters) while digram, the purely Greek formation, is generally used in academic linguistics specifically for a pair of letters;
- unigram (Latin uni-) vs. monogram, which has a different meaning.

Some derivations are idiosyncratic, not following the usual Greek compounding patterns even if they are composed entirely of Greek elements, for example:

- hadron < ἁδρός with the suffix -on, itself abstracted from Greek anion (ἀνιόν);
- henotheism < ἑν- 'one (root of εἷς) + ‑o‑ + θεός 'god', although heno- is not used as a prefix in Greek;
- taxonomy < τάξις 'order' + -nomy (-νομία 'study of'), inappropriately using an interfix -ο-. where the "more etymological form" is taxinomy, as found in ταξίαρχος, 'taxiarch', and the neologism taxidermy. Modern Greek uses ταξινομία in its reborrowing.
- psychedelic < ψυχή 'psyche' + δηλοῦν 'make manifest, reveal'; the regular formation is psychodelic, according to the ethnobotanist Richard Evans Schultes, or psychodelotic, according to the linguist Nick Nicholas;
- telegram; the regular formation is telegrapheme;
- heuristic, regular formation heuretic;
- hemoglobin, originally formed as hematoglobulin;
- chrysalis, regular spelling chrysallis;
- ptomaine, regular formation ptomatine;
- kerosene, hydrant, symbiont.

Many combining forms have specific technical meanings in neologisms, not predictable from the Greek sense (cf. libfix):

- -cyte or cyto- < κύτος 'container', means biological cells, not arbitrary containers.
- -oma < -ωμα, a generic morpheme forming deverbal nouns, such as diploma ('a folded thing') and glaucoma ('greyness'), comes to have the very narrow meaning of 'tumor' or 'swelling', on the model of words like carcinoma < καρκίνωμα. For example, melanoma does not come from μελάνωμα 'blackness', but rather from the modern combining forms melano- ('dark' [in biology]) + -oma ('tumor').
- -itis < -ῖτις, a generic adjectival suffix; in medicine used to mean a disease characterized by inflammation: appendicitis, conjunctivitis, ..., and now facetiously generalized to mean "feverish excitement".
- -osis < -ωσις, originally a state, condition, or process; in medicine, used for a disease.
- petro- < πέτρο- 'rock'; used to mean petroleum, as in petrodollars.
- syn- < συν- 'with'; refers to synthesis or synthesizers: syngas, Synclavier.

And some borrowings are modified in fairly arbitrary ways:

- gas (< χάος chaos) is irregular both in formation and in spelling;
- hecto-, kilo-, myria-, etymologically hecato-, chilio-, myrio-;

In standard chemical nomenclature, the numerical prefixes are "only loosely based on the corresponding Greek words", e.g. octaconta- is used for 80 instead of the Greek ogdoeconta- '80'. There are also "mixtures of Greek and Latin roots", e.g., nonaconta-, for 90, is a blend of the Latin nona- for 9 and the Greek -conta- found in words such as ἐνενήκοντα enenekonta '90'. The Greek form is, however, used in the names of polygons in mathematics, though the names of polyhedra are more idiosyncratic.

Many Greek affixes such as anti- and -ic have become productive in English, combining with arbitrary English words: antichoice, Fascistic.

Some words in English have been reanalyzed as a base plus affix, leading to affixes based on Greek words, but which are not affixes in Greek (cf. libfix). Their meaning relates to the full word they were shortened from, not the Greek meaning:

- -athon or -a-thon (from the portmanteau word walkathon, from walk + (mar)athon).
- -ase, used in chemistry for enzymes, is abstracted from diastase, where -ασις is not a morpheme at all in Greek.
- -on for elementary particles, from electron (which itself is not a Greek word, but a blend of electric and ion): lepton, neutron, phonon, ...
- -nomics refers specifically to economics: Reaganomics.
- heli- and -copter from helico-pter 'spiral-wing'

Nostalgia was coined by a 17th-century German as a calque of German Heimwehe.

=== Through other languages ===
Some Greek words were borrowed through Arabic and then Romance. Many are learned:

- alchemy (al- + χημεία or χημία)
  - chemist is a back-formation from alchemist
- elixir (al- + ξήριον)
- alembic (al- + ἄμβιξ)

Others are popular:

- bottarga (ᾠοτάριχον)
- tajine (τάγηνον)
- carat (κεράτιον)
- talisman (τέλεσμα)
- possibly quintal (κεντηνάριον < Latin centenarium (pondus)).

A few words took other routes:

- seine (a kind of fishing net) comes from a West Germanic form *sagīna, from Latin sagēna, from σαγήνη.
- effendi comes from Turkish, borrowed from Medieval Greek αυθέντης (/afˈθendis/, 'lord').
- hora (the dance) comes from Romanian and Modern Hebrew, borrowed from χορός 'dance'.
- marmelade comes via Portuguese marmelada (quince jelly), from Latin melimelum, from μελίμηλον 'variety of apple'.

=== Vernacular and learned doublets ===
Some Greek words have given rise to etymological doublets, being borrowed both through a later learned, direct route, and earlier through an organic, indirect route:

- ἀδάμας adamant, diamond;
- ἀμυγδάλη amygdala, almond;
- ἀνόρεκτος anorectic, anorexic from Hellenistic Greek;
- ἀντίφωνα antiphon, anthem;
- ἀποθήκη apothec(ary), boutique via French, bodega via Spanish;
- ἀσφόδελος asphodel, daffodil;
- αὐθεντικός authentic, effendi (αὐθέντης via Turkish);
- βάλσαμον (probably itself a borrowing from Semitic) balsam, balm;
- βάσις basis, base, bass (voice);
- βλάσφημος blasphemy, blame;
- βούτυρον butyr(ic), butter;
- διάβολος diabol(ic), devil;
- δραχμή drachma, dram, dirhem via Arabic;
- ἔλαιον elaeo-, oil, olive, oleum, latke via Eastern Slavic, Yiddish, Hellenistic ελάδιον;
- ἐλεημοσύνη eleemosynary, alms;
- ἐπίσκοπος episcop(al), bishop;
- ζῆλος zeal, jealous;
- ἡμικρανία hemicrania, migraine;
- θησαυρός thesaurus, treasure;
- ἰῶτα iota, jot;
- καθέδρα cathedra(l), chair, chaise;
- κάνναβις cannabis, canvas;
- κέρας/κέρατ- 'horn' keratin, carat via Arabic;
- κόλπος 'lap, womb, hollow, bay' colp(itis), gulf;
- κυβερνᾶν cybernetics, govern;
- πάπυρος papyrus, paper;
- παροικία parochial, parish;
- πόδιον podium, pew;
- πρεσβύτερος presbyter, priest;
- πυξίς pyx(is), box;
- σκάνδαλον scandal, slander;
- τρίπους/τρίποδ- tripod, tripos (both learned);
- τύμπανον 'drum' tympanum 'eardrum', timbre, timpani;
- φρενετικός frenetic, frantic;
- χειρουργός chirurgical, surgeon;
- χορός chorus, choir, hora (via Turkish, Romanian, and modern Hebrew);
- χρῖσμα chrism, cream;
- χρῑστιᾱνός Christian, christen, cretin;
- ὥρα horo(scope), hour.

Other doublets come from differentiation in the borrowing languages:

- γραμματική grammatic(al): grammar, glamor, grimoire;
- δίσκος discus: disc, dish, dais, and desk;
- κιθάρα cither: guitar, zither, gittern, cittern, etc.;
- κρύπτη crypt: grotto, (under)croft;
- παραβολή parabola: parable; additional doublets in Romance give palaver, parol, and parole;
- τόρνος (no learned borrowing): turn, tour
- φαντασία phantasy, fantasy, fantasia; fancy in 15th-century English.

=== From modern Greek ===
Finally, with the growth of tourism and emigration, some words reflecting modern Greek culture have been borrowed into English—many of them originally borrowings into Greek themselves:

- retsina
- ouzo
- souvlaki (< Latin)
- taverna (< Italian)
- moussaka (< Turkish < Arabic)
- baklava (< Turkish)
- feta (< Italian)
- bouzouki (< Turkish)
- gyro (the food, a calque of Turkish döner).

== Greek as an intermediary ==
Many words from the Hebrew Bible were transmitted to the western languages through the Greek of the Septuagint, often without morphological regularization:

- rabbi (ραββί)
- seraphim (σεραφείμ, σεραφίμ)
- paradise (παράδεισος < Hebrew < Persian)
- pharaoh (Φαραώ < Hebrew < Egyptian)

== Written form of Greek words in English ==
=== Latin-based orthography ===
Many Greek words, especially those borrowed through the literary tradition, are recognizable as such from their spelling. Latin had standard orthographies for Greek borrowings, including:

- Greek υ was written as 'y'
- η as 'e'
- θ as 'th'
- χ as 'ch'
- φ as 'ph'
- κ as 'c'
- rough breathing as 'h'
- both ι and ει as 'i'
- ου as 'u'

These conventions, which originally reflected pronunciation, have carried over into English and other languages with historical orthography, like French. They make it possible to recognize words of Greek origin, and give hints as to their pronunciation and inflection.

==== Digraphs and diphthongs ====
The romanization of some digraphs is rendered in various ways in English. The diphthongs αι and οι may be spelled in three different ways in English:

1. the Latinate digraphs ae and oe;
2. the ligatures æ and œ; and
3. the simple letter e.

The ligatures have largely fallen out of use worldwide; the digraphs are uncommon in American usage, but remain common in British usage. The spelling depends mostly on the variety of English, not on the particular word. Examples include: encyclopaedia / encyclopædia / encyclopedia; haemoglobin / hæmoglobin / hemoglobin; and oedema / œdema / edema. Some words are almost always written with the digraph or ligature: amoeba / amœba, rarely ameba; Oedipus / Œdipus, rarely Edipus; others are almost always written with the single letter: sphære and hæresie were obsolete by 1700; phænomenon by 1800; phænotype and phænol by 1930. The verbal ending -ίζω is spelled -ize in American English, and -ise or -ize in British English.

=== Non-latinate orthography ===
Since the 19th century, a few learned words have been introduced using a direct transliteration of Ancient Greek, including the Greek endings, rather than the traditional Latin-based spelling: nous (νοῦς), koine (κοινή), hoi polloi (οἱ πολλοί), kudos (κύδος), moron (μωρόν), kubernetes (κυβερνήτης). For this reason, the Ancient Greek digraph ει is rendered differently in different words—as i, following the standard Latin form: idol < εἴδωλον; or as ei, transliterating the Greek directly: eidetic (< εἰδητικός), deixis, seismic. Similarly ου may be written as ou: acoustic (via 17th century French), doula, ousia, ouroboros, kouros, boustrephedon, etc.

=== Irregularities ===
Most learned borrowings and coinages follow the Latin system, but there are some irregularities:

- eureka (cf. heuristic);
- kaleidoscope (the regular spelling would be calidoscope)
- kinetic (cf. cinematography);
- krypton (cf. cryptic);
- acolyte (< ἀκόλουθος; acoluth would be the etymological spelling, but acolythus, acolotus, acolithus are all found in Latin);
- stoichiometry (< στοιχεῖον; regular spelling would be st(o)echio-).
- aneurysm was formerly often spelled aneurism on the assumption that it uses the usual -ism ending.

Some words whose spelling in French and Middle English did not reflect their Greco-Latin origins were refashioned with etymological spellings in the 16th and 17th centuries: caracter became character and quire became choir.

=== Indications of Greek origin ===
In some cases, a word's spelling clearly shows its Greek origin:

- If it includes ph pronounced as /f/ or y between consonants, it is very likely Greek.
- If it includes rrh, phth, or chth; or starts with hy-, ps-, rh-, or chr-; or the rarer pt-, ct-, chth-, pn-, x-, sth-, mn-, tm-, gn-, gm-, or bd-, it is likely Greek.

Some words following these patterns are not in fact of Greek origin:

- The ph in nephew is a 15th century English innovation; the ph in sulphur is a Latin innovation.
- A few borrowings from Arabic are spelled with ph: cipher, nenuphar, caliph, saphena.
- Gnat, gnaw, gneiss are Germanic.
- Ptarmigan is from a Gaelic word, the p having been added by false etymology;
- Style and stylus are of Latin origin, and are probably written with a y because the Greek word στῦλος stylos 'column' (as in peristyle, 'surrounded by columns') and the Latin word stilus 'stake, pointed instrument', were confused.
- Algorithm is from Arabic, and was originally written algorism, but was respelled in the 16th century, modelled on arithmetic.

Some are of Greek origin, but the ph spelling does not come from Greek but Latin:

- Trophy, Greek τρόπαιον had a π.
- Triumph, Greek θρίαμβος had a β.

=== Homographs of different origin ===
The conflation of ο/ω and αι/ε/η/οι in the usual orthography leads to a few words which are homographs in English although they were distinct roots in Greek: colon 'punctuation mark' (κώλον) vs. 'part of intestine' (κόλον); coma 'unconsciousness' (κῶμα) vs. 'comet tail' (κόμη); ionic 'about ions' (ιονικός) vs. Ionic 'from Ionia' (ιωνικός); chorography 'description of dance' (χορογραφία) vs. 'description of region' (χωρογραφία); pore 'opening in the skin' (πόρος) vs. 'callus' (rare and obsolete) (πώρος). Other cases are unrelated to vowel conflation: policy 'principle' (πολιτεία) vs. 'insurance contract' (ἀπόδειξις via Latin apodissa, Italian polizza, French police).

There are also some affixes like this, some productive, some not: halo 'light ring' (ἅλως) vs. halo- 'salt-' (ἁλο-); chor- 'dance' (χορός) vs. 'region' (χώρα); p(a)edo- 'child' (παιδ-) p(a)ediatrics, p(a)edology (rare) vs. pedo- 'soil' (πέδ-) pedology; metro- 'measure' (μετρο-) metrology vs. 'uterus' (μητρο- < μήτρα) metropolis, metrorrhagia; ceno- 'empty' (κενο-) cenotaph vs. 'new, recent' (καινο-) Cenozoic vs. c(o)eno- 'common, shared' (κοινο-) c(o)enobite. Rarer examples are por- 'passage' (πόρος) vs. 'callus' (πώρος); omo- 'shoulder' (ὦμος) omophorion vs. 'raw' (ὠμός) omophagy. In the case of lipo-, the two roots were already homographs in Greek: 'fat' (λίπος) lipoprotein vs. 'lacking' (λίπο- < λείπειν) lipogram. Similarly, -carp- (καρπός) can mean 'wrist' carpal (tunnel) vs. 'fruit' pericarp.

A few words of Greek origin are homonyms of words of non-Greek origin, written and pronounced the same, such as pole (Greek πόλος 'axis', Latin palus 'rod'), plane (Greek πλάτανος 'kind of tree', Latin planus 'flat'), base (Greek βάσις 'step, pedestal', Latin bassus 'thick, low-status').

=== Pronunciation ===
In clusters such as ps-, pn-, and gn- which are not allowed in English phonotactics, the usual English pronunciation drops the first consonant (e.g., psychology) at the start of a word; compare gnostic [nɒstɪk] and agnostic [ægnɒstɪk]; there are a few exceptions, such as tmesis [t(ə)miːsɪs]. Similarly, initial x- is pronounced [z-].

Ch is pronounced like k rather than as in "church": e.g. character, chaos. The consecutive vowel letters 'ea' are generally pronounced separately rather than forming a single vowel sound when transcribing a Greek εα, which was not a digraph, but simply a sequence of two vowels with hiatus, as in genealogy or pancreas (cf., however, ocean, ωκεανός); zeal (earlier zele) comes irregularly from the η in ζήλος.

Some sound sequences in English are only found in borrowings from Greek, notably initial sequences of two fricatives, as in sphere. Most initial /z/ sounds are found in Greek borrowings.

The stress of borrowings via Latin generally follows the traditional English pronunciation of Latin, which depends on the syllable weight rules in Latin and ignores Greek stress. For example, in Greek, both ὑπόθεσις (hypothesis) and ἐξήγησις (exegesis) are accented on the antepenult, and indeed the penult has a long vowel in exegesis; but because the penult of Latin exegēsis is heavy by Latin rules, the accent falls on the penult in Latin and therefore also in English.

== Inflectional endings and plurals ==
Though many English words derived from Greek through the literary route drop the inflectional endings (tripod, zoology, pentagon) or use Latin endings (papyrus, mausoleum), some preserve the Greek endings:

- -ον: phenomenon, criterion, neuron, lexicon;
- -∅: plasma, drama, dilemma, trauma (-ma is derivational, not inflectional);
- -ος: chaos, ethos, asbestos, pathos, cosmos;
- -ς: climax (ξ x = k + s), helix, larynx, eros, pancreas, atlas;
- -η: catastrophe, agape, psyche;
- -ις: analysis, basis, crisis, emphasis;
- -ης: diabetes, herpes, isosceles.

In cases like scene and zone, though the Greek words ended in -η, the final silent e in English is not derived from the η.

Most plurals of words ending in -is are -es (pronounced [iːz]), using the regular Latin plural rather than the Greek -εις: crises, analyses, bases, hypotheses, with only some rare didactic words having English plurals in -eis: poleis, necropoleis, and acropoleis (though acropolises is far more common).

In the case of Greek endings, plurals sometimes follow the Greek rules: phenomenon, phenomena; tetrahedron, tetrahedra; stigma, stigmata; topos, topoi; cyclops, cyclopes. Normally, however, they do not: colon, colons not *cola (except for the very rare technical term of rhetoric); pentathlon, pentathlons not *pentathla; demon, demons not *demones; climaxes, not *climaces.

Usage is mixed in some cases: schema, schemas or schemata; lexicon, lexicons or lexica; helix, helixes or helices; sphinx, sphinges or sphinxes; clitoris, clitorises or clitorides. And there are misleading cases: pentagon comes from Greek pentagonon, so its plural cannot be *pentaga; it is pentagons—the Greek form would be *pentagona (cf. Plurals from Latin and Greek).

== Verbs ==
A few dozen English verbs are derived from the corresponding Greek verbs; examples are baptize, blame and blaspheme, stigmatize, ostracize, and cauterize. In addition, the Greek verbal suffix -ize is productive in Latin, the Romance languages, and English: words like metabolize, though composed of a Greek root and a Greek suffix, are modern compounds. A few of these also existed in Ancient Greek, such as crystallize, characterize, and democratize, but were probably coined independently in modern languages. This is particularly clear in cases like allegorize and synergize, where the Greek verbs ἀλληγορεῖν and συνεργεῖν do not end in -ize at all. Some English verbs with ultimate Greek etymologies, like pause and cycle, were formed as denominal verbs in English, even though there are corresponding Greek verbs, παῦειν/παυσ- and κυκλεῖν.

== Borrowings and cognates ==
Greek and English share many Indo-European cognates. In some cases, the cognates can be confused with borrowings. For example, the English mouse is cognate with Greek μῦς /mys/ and Latin mūs, all from an Indo-European word *mūs; none of them is borrowed from another. Similarly, acre is cognate to Latin ager and Greek αγρός, but not a borrowing; the prefix agro- is a borrowing from Greek, and the prefix agri- a borrowing from Latin.

== Phrases ==
Many Latin phrases are used verbatim in English texts—et cetera (etc.), ad nauseam, modus operandi (M.O.), ad hoc, in flagrante delicto, mea culpa, and so on—but this is rare for Greek phrases or expressions. The only somewhat common ones are:

- eureka 'I have found [it]'
- hoi polloi 'the many'

Text scholars use:

- hapax legomenon 'once said'

Even rarer are:

- kyrie eleison 'Lord, have mercy', part of the Latin Mass
- kalos kagathos 'beautiful and virtuous'

== Calques and translations ==
Greek technical words were often calqued in Latin rather than borrowed, and then borrowed from Latin into English. Examples include:

- (grammatical) case, from casus ('an event', 'something that has fallen'), a semantic calque of Greek πτώσις ('a fall');
- nominative, from nōminātīvus, a translation of Greek ὀνομαστική;
- adverb, a morphological calque of Greek ἐπίρρημα as ad- + verbum;
- magnanimous, from Greek μεγάθυμος (lit. 'great spirit');
- essence, from essentia, which was constructed from the notional present participle *essens, imitating Greek οὐσία.
- substance, from substantia, a calque of Greek υπόστασις (cf. hypostasis);
- Cicero coined moral on analogy with Greek ηθικός.
- recant is modeled on παλινῳδεῖν.

Greek phrases were also calqued in Latin. Sometimes English uses the Latin form:

- deus ex machina 'god out of the machine' was calqued from the Greek apò mēkhanês theós (ἀπὸ μηχανῆς θεός).
- materia medica is a short form of Dioscorides' De Materia Medica, from Περὶ ὕλης ἰατρικῆς.
- quod erat demonstrandum (Q.E.D.) is a calque of ὅπερ ἔδει δεῖξαι.
- quintessence is post-classical quinta essentia, from Greek πέμπτη οὐσία.

Sometimes the Latin is in turn calqued in English:

- English commonplace is a calque of locus communis, itself a calque of Greek κοινός τόπος.
- subject matter is a calque of subiecta māteria, itself a calque of Aristotle's phrase "ἡ ὑποκειμένη ὕλη."
- wisdom tooth came to English from dentes sapientiae, from Arabic aḍrāsu 'lḥikmi, from σωϕρονιστῆρες, used by Hippocrates.
- political animal is from πολιτικὸν ζῷον (in Aristotle's Politics).

The Greek word εὐαγγέλιον has come into English both in borrowed forms like evangelical and the form gospel, an English calque (Old English gód spel 'good tidings') of bona adnuntiatio, itself a calque of the Greek.

== Statistics ==
The contribution of Greek to the English vocabulary can be quantified in two ways, type and token frequencies: type frequency counts the distinct words; token frequency counts the instances of words in texts.

Since most words of Greek origin are specialized technical and scientific coinages, the type frequency is considerably higher than the token frequency. And the type frequency in a large word list will be larger than that in a small word list. In a typical English dictionary of 80,000 words, which corresponds very roughly to the vocabulary of an educated English speaker, about 5% of the words are borrowed from Greek.

=== Most common ===
Of the 500 most common words in English, 21 (4.2%) are of Greek origin: place (rank 115), problem (121), school (147), system (180), turn (194), program (241), govern(ment) (216), hour (247), idea (252), story (307), base (328), center (335), period (383), history (386), type (390), music (393), political (395), policy (400), paper (426), phone (480), economic (494).

== See also ==
- List of Greek and Latin roots in English
- List of Greek morphemes used in English
- List of Latin and Greek words commonly used in systematic names
- Transliteration of Greek into English
- Classical compound
- Hybrid word
- Latin influence in English
