= Émile Duclaux =

French microbiologist and chemist (1840-1904)

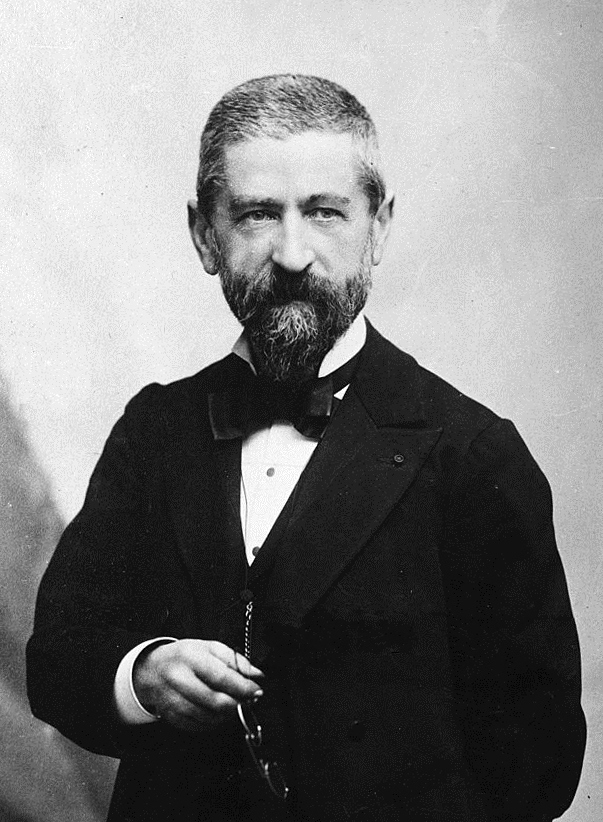
- Emile Duclaux in the 1900s
- Born: June 24, 1840; Aurillac, Cantal, Auvergne Rhône-Alpes, France
- Died: May 3, 1904 (aged 63); Paris, Paris, Île-de-France, France
- Occupations: Physicist, Biologist and Chemist
- Children: 3; Jacques Eugene Duclaux
- Scientific career
- Thesis: Etudes relatives à l'absorption de l'ammoniaque et à la production d'acides gras volatils pendant la fermentation alcoolique (1865)

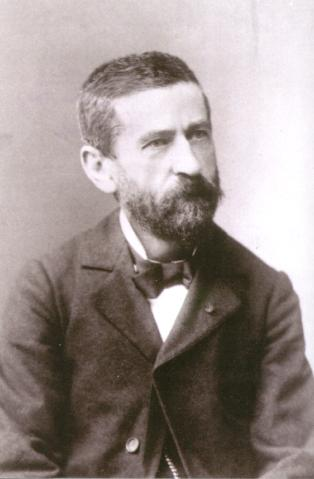
Émile Duclaux, circa 1890

Émile Duclaux (24 June 1840 – May 2, 1904) was a French microbiologist and chemist born in Aurillac, Cantal.

He studied at the College of Aurillac, the Lycée Saint-Louis in Paris and at École Normale Supérieure. In 1862 he began work as an assistant in the laboratory of Louis Pasteur (1822–1895). During his career, he taught classes in Tours (1865), Clermont-Ferrand (1866), Lyon (from 1873) and Paris (from 1878). In Paris, he was a professor of meteorology at the Institute of Agronomy. For much of his career he was associated with the work of Louis Pasteur.

In 1888 he was elected to the Académie des sciences, and in 1894 became a member of the Académie Nationale de Médecine.

Duclaux's work was largely in the fields of chemistry, bacteriology, hygiene and agriculture. Duclaux initiated the custom of naming enzymes by adding the suffix "-ase" to the enzyme's substrate. His intention was to honor the first scientists (namely Anselme Payen, 1795–1871; and Jean-François Persoz, 1805–1868) to isolate an enzyme; "diastase", in 1833. With Pasteur, he collaborated in the study of silkworm diseases, and also took part in experiments to debunk the theory of spontaneous generation. In the 1870s, he undertook studies of phylloxera, an aphid-like pest that plagued grape vineyards. In addition, he performed research on the composition of milk, and conducted studies on beer and wine.

In 1887 he began publication of the Annales de l'Institut Pasteur, with Charles Chamberland (1851-1908), Jacques-Joseph Grancher (1843–1907), Edmond Nocard (1850–1903) and Pierre Paul Émile Roux (1853–1933) as members of the first editorial board. Following Pasteur's death in 1895, Duclaux became director of the Institute, with Roux and Chamberland serving as its sub-directors.

Duclaux was a prolific writer, some of his better known publications were Traité de microbiologie, L'hygiène sociale, Ferments et maladies and Pasteur, histoire d'un esprit, the latter being a biography dedicated to Pasteur.

Being actively involved in French politics, he was a vocal supporter of Alfred Dreyfus (1859-1935), when the latter was unjustly accused of treason. Duclaux's second wife, Agnes Mary Frances Duclaux (maiden name Agnes Mary Frances Robinson 1857–1944), was a well-known author, and his son, Jacques Eugène Duclaux (1877–1978), was a highly regarded chemist.
