= Duclaux =

Duclaux may refer to:

== People ==
- Agnes Mary Frances Duclaux (1857–1944), English writer and Francophile scholar
- Émile Duclaux (1840–1904), French microbiologist and chemist
- Jacques Duclaux (1877–1978), French biologist and chemist

== Places ==
- Duclaux Point, a location in the Antarctic
