= Italian grammar =

Grammar of the Italian language

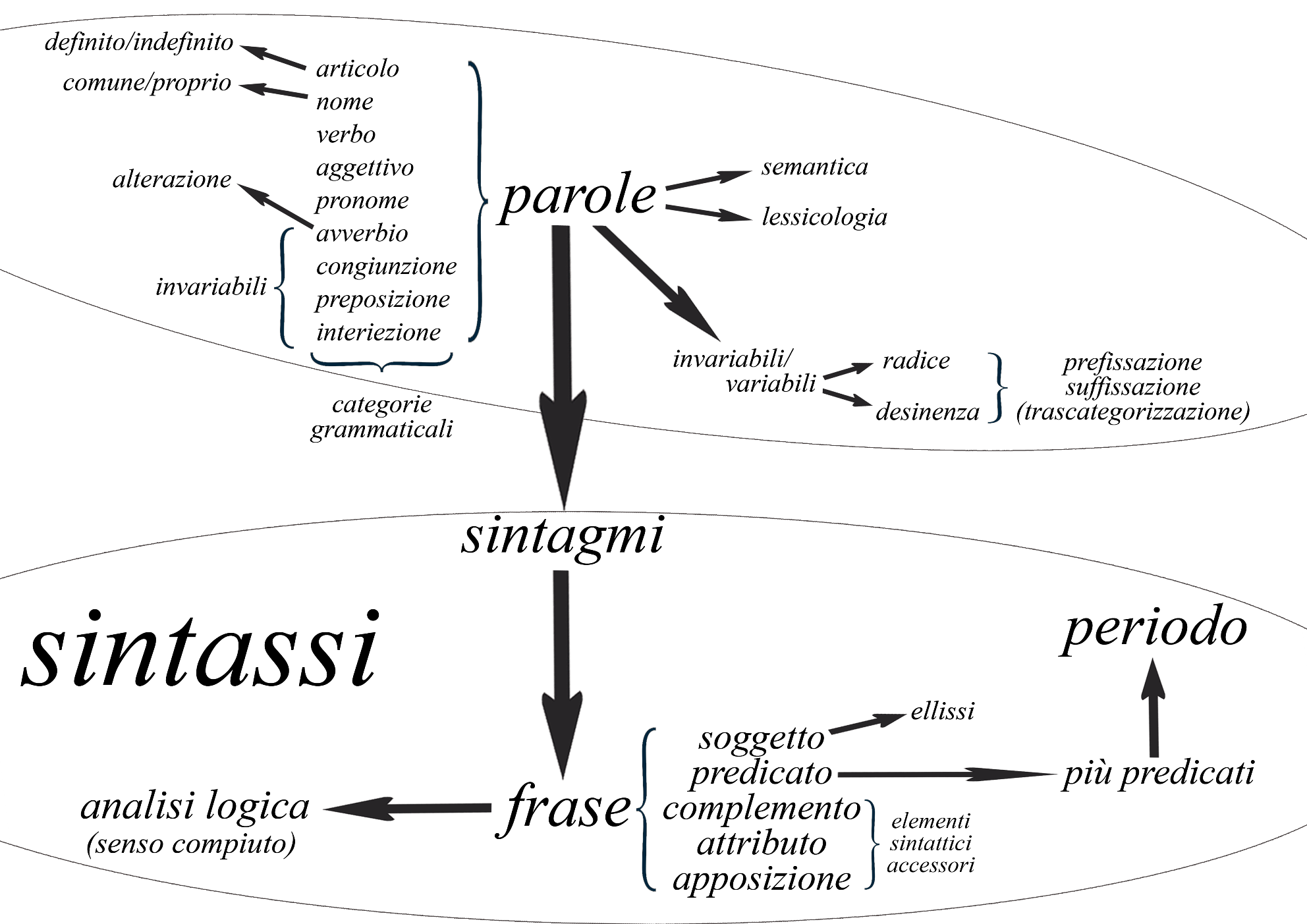
Synoptic diagram of the parts of speech (or grammatical categories) and the fundamental elements of syntax for the Italian language

Italian grammar is the body of rules describing the properties of the Italian language. Italian words can be divided into the following lexical categories: articles, nouns, adjectives, pronouns, verbs, adverbs, prepositions, conjunctions, and interjections.

== Articles ==
Italian articles vary according to definiteness (definite, indefinite, and partitive), number, gender, and the initial sound of the subsequent word. Partitive articles compound the preposition di with the corresponding definite article, to express uncertain quantity. In the plural, they typically translate into English as 'few'; in the singular, typically as 'some'.

Definite article
Gender	Number	Article	Usage
Masculine	Singular	il	Standard masculine singular definite article, used in all cases other than those detailed below. Foreign words beginning with ⟨w⟩, pronounced /w/ or /v/, take il and not lo: il West /ˈwɛst/ (referring to the American Old West), il whisky /ˈwiski/, il Watt /ˈvat/, etc.
Masculine	Singular	lo	Used before words with certain initial sounds: before ⟨s⟩ pronounced as /s/, /z/, or /ʃ/ followed by another consonant ("impure s", Italian: S (esse) complicata, S impura, or S preconsonantica); before self-geminating consonants: ⟨z⟩, pronounced as /ts/ or /dz/; ⟨gn⟩; ⟨gli⟩; ⟨sci⟩ (or ⟨sh⟩ or ⟨ch⟩ in loan words, e.g. lo chef) pronounced as /ʃ/; before complex consonant clusters ⟨ps⟩, pronounced as /ps/ or /ss/; ⟨pn⟩ as /pn/ or /nn/; ⟨x⟩ as /ks/ or /ss/, ⟨mn⟩ as /mn/ or /nn/, etc., mostly foreign words; before ⟨y⟩ or ⟨i⟩ pronounced as the semivowel /j/, (e.g. foreign words such as lo yoghurt, and local words and scientific or geographical names such as lo iodio)
Masculine	Singular	l'	Used before words that begin with a vowel (l'amico) or ⟨uo⟩ /wɔ/ (l'uomo).
Masculine	Plural	i	Standard masculine plural definite article, used for plurals that take il in the singular: i cani (plural of il cane).
Masculine	Plural	gli	Corresponds to lo and l' in the singular: before vowels, pronounced /ʎ/; before the consonants listed for lo, pronounced /ʎi/; Il dio ('the god') has the irregular plural gli dei ('the gods').
Feminine	Singular	la	Standard form of the feminine singular definite article, used before consonants and before ⟨i⟩ when pronounced as semivowel /j/, e.g. la iarda.
Feminine	Singular	l'	As with l', used before any word that begins with a vowel, not including ⟨i⟩ when pronounced as the semivowel /j/.
Feminine	Plural	le	Standard form of the feminine plural definite article, never elided.

Indefinite article
Gender	Article	Usage
Masculine	un	Standard masculine singular indefinite article, used before vowels and simple consonants.
Masculine	uno	Used instead of un before "impure s", self-geminating consonants, and complex consonant clusters, following the same rules as lo vs. il above, for example: uno studente.
Feminine	una	Standard feminine singular indefinite article.
Feminine	un'	Used before any word that starts with a vowel, not including ⟨i⟩ when used as semivowel /j/.

Partitive article
Gender	Number	Article	Contraction of
Masculine	Singular	del	di + il
Masculine	Singular	dell'	di + l'
Masculine	Singular	dello	di + lo
Masculine	Plural	dei	di + i
Masculine	Plural	degli	di + gli
Feminine	Singular	della	di + la
Feminine	Singular	dell'	di + l'
Feminine	Plural	delle	di + le

== Inflection of nouns and adjectives ==
Nouns have gender (masculine, feminine or, in many instances, both) and inflect in number (singular and plural). When a noun refers to people or animals with natural gender, grammatical gender typically corresponds. The gender each noun is written in is not arbitrary: because most nouns have a masculine and a feminine form, the form the given noun is written in could change the entire structure of the sentence. As in most other Romance languages, the historical neuter has merged with the masculine. A subgroup of these deriving from Latin's second declension are considered feminine in the plural. Subclauses and infinitives are masculine. Adjectives inflect for gender and number in patterns broadly similar to nouns.

General noun and adjectival endings by number and gender
Gender	Singular	Plural	Example
Masculine	-o	-i	il cappello nero, i cappelli neri ('the black hat(s)')
Feminine	-a	-e	la bella macchina, le belle macchine ('the beautiful car(s)')
Masculine and feminine	-e	-i	il/la comandante intelligente, i/le comandanti intelligenti ('the smart commander(s)')
Mixed (historically neuter)	-o	-a	il lenzuolo leggero, le lenzuola leggere ('the light bed sheet(s)')
Masculine	-a	-i	l'atleta entusiasta, gli atleti entusiasti ('the enthusiastic athlete(s)')
Feminine	-ie	-ie	la specie estinta, le specie estinte ('the extinct species')
All nouns ending with a stressed vowel	singular = plural		la città, le città ('the city(-ies)')
Non-integrated loanwords	singular = plural		il/la manager trendy, i/le manager trendy ('the trendy manager(s)')

In the last two examples, only the article carries information about gender and number.

Most masculine words that end in -io pronounced as /jo/ drop the -o and thus end in -i in the plural: vecchio / vecchi ('old'), funzionario / funzionari ('functionary(-ies)'), esempio / esempi ('example(s)'), etc.

The Italian hard and soft C and G phenomenon leads to certain peculiarities in spelling and pronunciation:

- Words in -cio and -gio form plurals in -ci and -gi, e.g. bacio / baci ('kiss(es)')
- Words in -cia and -gia have been a point of contention. According to a commonly employed rule, they:
  - form plurals in -ce and -ge if the final letter before the suffix is a consonant: frangia, frange ('fringe(s)'); faccia, facce ('face(s)').
  - form plurals in -cie and -gie if the final letter before the suffix is a vowel: camicia, camicie ('shirt(s)'); ciliegia, ciliegie ('cherry'/'cherries'). Note that the presence of an i in the plural ending has no impact on the pronunciation in this case.
  - when the i is stressed, it always remains in plural: farmacia / farmacie ('chemist's shop(s)'), nevralgia / nevralgie ('neuralgia(s)').
- Words in -co and -go behave irregularly: for some words the plural form causes the hard consonant to become soft, and for others the consonant remains hard. "The grammarians are skeptical of any attempt at giving a ruling about this area." There are, however, certain rules of thumb:
  - plurals are formed with -chi and -ghi if the last letter before the suffix is a consonant or a stressed vowel: fungo / funghi ('mushroom(s)'), stecco / stecchi ('stick(s)'), mago / maghi ('magician(s)'), fuoco / fuochi ('fire(s)')
  - plurals are formed with -ci and -gi if the last letter before the suffix is an unstressed vowel: comico / comici ('comedian(s)'), medico / medici ('physician(s)')
  - in words ending with -logo suffix, the plural is usually in -gi when -logo means 'expert' or 'student', corresponding to English -logist (e.g. archeologo / archeologi, 'archaeologist(s)'), while it is in -ghi when it means 'speech' or 'reasoning', corresponding often to English -logue/-log (e.g. catalogo / cataloghi, 'catalogue(s)').
  - there are exceptions such as amico / amici ('friend(s)'), greco / greci ('Greek(s)'), valico / valichi ('mountain pass(es)'), carico / carichi ('cargo(s)').
- Words in -ca and -ga form plurals in -che and -ghe, e.g. amica / amiche ('female friend(s)')

== Nouns ==
Most nouns are derived from Latin. Many of these are themselves borrowed from Greek (e.g. poeta below). Although Italian nouns do not inflect for case, they are derived from a mixture of the Latin nominative and accusative cases:

Derivation of noun inflections
Latin declension (nominative/accusative)	Italian singular/plural	Masculine	Feminine
1st (-a, -ae / -am, -ās)	-a, -e		amica / amiche 'female friend(s)'
1st & 2nd (-a, -i / -, -)	-a, -i	poeta / poeti 'poet(s)'	ala/ali 'wing(s)'
2nd (-us, -ī / -um, -ōs)	-o, -i	amico / amici 'friend(s)'	
3rd (-is, -ēs / -em, -ēs)	-e, -i	cane / cani 'dog(s)'	parete / pareti 'wall(s)'
4th (-us, -ūs / -um, -ūs)	-o, -i	passo / passi 'step(s)'	mano / mani 'hand(s)'
5th (-ēs, -ēs / -em, -ēs)	-e, -i		fede / fedi 'faith(s)'

Nouns ending in any letter other than -a, -e or -o, as well as nouns ending in a stressed vowel, are normally invariable in the plural. Thus:

- la gru / le gru ('the crane(s)', from Latin grūs / grūes)
- la città / le città ('the city(ies)', contracted form of archaic cittade, cittadi, from Latin cīvitātem, cīvitātēs)
- il caffè / i caffè ('the coffee(s)')
- il film / i film ('the film(s)')

There are certain words (derived from Latin second-declension neuter nouns) that are masculine in the singular and feminine or masculine in the plural. Examples include:

- il braccio / le braccia or i bracci ('the arm(s)')
- l'uovo / le uova ('the egg(s)')
- il ginocchio / le ginocchia or i ginocchi ('the knee(s)')
- il sopracciglio / le sopracciglia or i sopraccigli ('the eyebrow(s)')

These nouns' endings derive regularly from the Latin neuter endings of the second declension (sg. -um / pl. -a), but there are some from the third declension as well: e.g. il gregge / le greggi ('flock(s)', but i greggi works, too); the tradition of calling them "irregular" or "mobile gender" (genere mobile) would come from the paradigm that there are so few nouns of this type that the existence of neuter can be considered vestigial (compared to Romanian, which has many more nouns of the masculine singular–feminine plural type, and as such are usually classified as a separate neuter gender). The choice of plural is sometimes left to the user, while in some cases there are differences of meaning:

- Sometimes, for body parts, the feminine/neuter plural denotes the literal meaning while the masculine one denotes a figurative meaning: il braccio ('the arm') / le braccia ('the arms') / i bracci ('the isthmuses', 'the inlets'); il corno ('the horn') / le corna ('the horns' of an animal) / i corni ('the horns' as musical instruments)
- Sometimes, especially in poetic and old-fashioned Italian, the masculine plural acts as a count noun, while the neuter/feminine plural acts as a mass noun: il cervello ('the brain') / due cervelli ('two brains') / le cervella ('the cerebral matter'); l'anello ('the ring') / due anelli ('two rings') / le anella ('ringlets'); furthermore, il dito ('the finger') / le dita ('the fingers') and also due dita ('two fingers') / but i diti indici ('the index fingers')

Most noun stems are derived from the accusative: Latin socer/socerum begets Italian suocero, and Latin pēs/pēdem begets Italian piede. There are a few exceptions, however, such as uomo from Latin homo/hominem and moglie from Latin mulier/mulierem. Neuter third-declension nouns may bequeath Italian nouns either from the nominative/accusative case (e.g. capo from caput, cuore from cor) or from the oblique case used for other cases and for the plural (e.g. latte from lac, lact-, giure from ius, iur-).

=== Irregular plurals ===
There are a few genuine irregular plurals in Italian (plurali irregolari). Most of these were introduced in Vulgar Latin, but some derive from irregular Latin plurals. Examples include:

- uomo / uomini ('man'/'men'; Latin homo / homines)
- il dio / gli dei ('god(s)'; note also the irregularity in the article: gli instead of i)
- bue / buoi ('ox(en)'; Latin bovem / boves)
- tempio / templi ('temple(s)'; the plural retains the l from Vulgar Latin templi in order to distinguish it from tempi, the plural of tempo; the l is lost in the singular)

=== Alteration ===
In Italian, altered nouns are nouns with particular shades of meaning. They are divided into diminutives, vezzeggiativi (diminutives with kindness and sympathy nuance), augmentatives and pejoratives.

	Suffix	Example	
diminutivi (diminutive)	-ino	tavolo (table)	tavolino (small table)
diminutivi (diminutive)	-etto	libro (book)	libretto (booklet)
diminutivi (diminutive)	-atto	cerbia (deer)	cerbiatto (fawn)
diminutivi (diminutive)	-ello	bambino (child)	bambinello (small child)
diminutivi (diminutive)	-icello	monte (mountain)	monticello
diminutivi (diminutive)	-icciolo	porto (port)	porticciolo
diminutivi (diminutive)	-acchio	orso (bear)	orsacchio
vezzeggiativi (terms of endearment)	-uccio	cavallo (horse)	cavalluccio
vezzeggiativi (terms of endearment)	-acchiotto	orso (bear)	orsacchiotto (teddy bear)
vezzeggiativi (terms of endearment)	-iciattolo	fiume (river)	fiumiciattolo
vezzeggiativi (terms of endearment)	-olo	figlio (son)	figliolo (also figliuolo)
vezzeggiativi (terms of endearment)	-otto	cucciolo (puppy)	cucciolotto
accrescitivi (augmentative)	-one	libro (book)	librone (big book, tome)
accrescitivi (augmentative)	-accione	uomo (man)	omaccione
dispregiativi (pejorative)	-accio	libro (book)	libraccio (bad book)
dispregiativi (pejorative)	-astro	medico (medic)	medicastro (quack doctor)
dispregiativi (pejorative)	-ucolo	poeta (poet)	poetucolo (poetaster)
dispregiativi (pejorative)	-onzolo	medico (medic)	mediconzolo
dispregiativi (pejorative)	-uncolo	uomo (man)	omuncolo (insignificant man)
dispregiativi (pejorative)	-otto	contadino (farmer)	contadinotto (peasant)

Many other alterations can be built, sometimes with more than one suffix: for example, libro ('book') can become libretto (diminutive), libricino (double diminutive), libercolo (diminutive + pejorative), libraccio (pejorative), libraccione (pejorative + augmentative). Uomo ('man'), coming from Latin homo, becomes om- in altered forms: omino/ometto (diminutive), omone (augmentative), omaccio (pejorative), omaccione (augmentative + pejorative).

== Adjectives ==
In Italian, an adjective can be placed before or after the noun. The unmarked placement for most adjectives (e.g. colours, nationalities) is after the noun, but this is reversed for a few common classes of adjective—those denoting beauty, age, goodness, and size are placed before the noun in the unmarked case, and after the noun for emphasis.

Placing the adjective after the noun can alter its meaning or indicate restrictiveness of reference. If a noun has many adjectives, usually no more than one will be before the noun.

- un libro rosso = a red book (the unmarked case)
- un rosso libro = a book that is red (the marked case; it is especially important to the intended meaning that the book is red, as opposed to some other color)
- un buon uomo = a good man (the unmarked case)
- un uomo buono = a man who is good (the marked case; it is especially important to the intended meaning that he is good, the adjective is emphasized)

Adjectives are inflected for gender and number:

Gender	Grammatical number	Case 1	Case 2
Masculine	Singular	-o	-e
Masculine	Plural	-i	-i
Feminine	Singular	-a	-e
Feminine	Plural	-e	-i

=== Degrees of comparison ===
Italian has three degrees of comparison: comparative, relative superlative and absolute superlative.

The comparative and relative superlative are formed with più ('more', 'most'); for instance:

- sono più alto di te ("I am taller than you")
- sono il più alto fra gli uomini ("I am the tallest of men")

Vice versa when expressing inferiority, meno ('less, fewer') is used; for instance:

- sono il meno forte del campionato ("I am the least strong of the championship")
- tu sei meno alto di me ("You are less tall than me")

Another comparative form is made with the word come ('as', 'like'); for instance:

- sono alto come te ("I am as tall as you")

The absolute comparative is formed by placing troppo ('too') before the adjective; for instance:

- sei troppo buono ("you are too good").

The absolute superlative, derived from the Latin synthetic superlative in -issimus, is formed by adding -issimo to an adjective: intelligente ('intelligent'), intelligentissimo ('very intelligent'); sporco ('dirty') sporchissimo ('very dirty'). If the two letters before the last vowel are pr or br (e.g. aspro, celebre), the r is removed and -errimo is the suffix used (asperrimo, celeberrimo) ('very sour', 'very famous'). Another way to form the absolute superlative is to place either molto or assai ('very') before the adjective. For instance sporchissimo and molto sporco ('very dirty') are the same, although the form ending in issimo is usually perceived as more emphatic; that is, sporchissimo is dirtier than molto sporco.

Some adjectives have irregular comparatives (although with regularly-formed variants also in common use), such as

- buono ('good'), migliore / più buono ('better' or 'best'), ottimo / buonissimo ('very good')
- cattivo ('bad'), peggiore / più cattivo ('worse' or 'worst'), pessimo / cattivissimo ('very bad')
- grande ('big'), maggiore / più grande ('bigger'), massimo / grandissimo ('very big')
- piccolo ('small'), minore / più piccolo ('smaller'), minimo / piccolissimo ('very small')

=== Possessive adjectives ===
With the exception of 3rd person plural loro ('their'), possessive adjectives, like articles, must agree with the gender and number of the noun they modify. Hence, mio zio ('my uncle'), but mia zia ('my aunt'). So depending on what is being modified, the possessive adjectives are:

Person	Masculine		Feminine	
Person	Singular	Plural	Singular	Plural
1st sing.	mio	miei	mia	mie
2nd sing.	tuo	tuoi	tua	tue
3rd sing.	suo	suoi	sua	sue
1st pl.	nostro	nostri	nostra	nostre
2nd pl.	vostro	vostri	vostra	vostre
3rd pl.	loro			

In most cases the possessive adjective is used with an article, usually the definite article:

Ho perso la mia penna.	("I have lost my pen.")
Mi piace il mio lavoro.	("I like my job.")
Hanno rubato la mia automobile!	("They have stolen my car!")

And sometimes with the indefinite article:

Un mio amico mi ha detto che...	("A friend of mine told me that...")
Ho visto una sua foto.	("I have seen a photograph of him/her.")
Luca è un mio amico.	("Luke is a friend of mine.")

The only exception is when the possessive refers to an individual family member (unless the family member is described or characterised in some way):

Laura è mia sorella	("Laura is my sister.")
Ieri ho visto mia sorella Diana	("I saw my sister Diana yesterday.")
Questa penna è di mia zia.	("This pen is my aunt's.")

Mamma and papà (or babbo, in central Italy; 'mother' and 'father'), however, are usually used with the article.

For emphasis, however, possessive adjectives are sometimes placed after the noun. This is usually after words such as colpa ('fault', 'sin'); casa ('house', 'home'); merito ('merit'); piacere ('pleasure'); or in nouns of address.

È colpa sua.	("It is his/her fault.")
Oh dio mio!	("Oh, my god!")
Arrivederci, amico mio!	("Goodbye, my friend!")
Vorresti andare a casa mia?	("Would you like to come over to my house?")

If the antecedent of a third person possessive (being used as an object) is the subject of the sentence, proprio can be used instead of suo, although the usage of proprio is declining in spoken language:

Marco e Maria hanno discusso di filosofia. Marco ha scelto il proprio punto di vista.	("Marco and Maria discussed philosophy. Marco took his own point of view.")
Marco e Maria hanno discusso di filosofia. Marco ha scelto il suo punto di vista.	("Marco and Maria discussed philosophy. Marco took his/her point of view.")

The first sentence is unambiguous and states that Marco took his own point of view, whereas the second sentence is ambiguous because it may mean that Marco took either his own or Maria's point of view.

=== Demonstrative adjectives ===
Italian originally had three degrees of demonstrative adjectives: questo (for items near or related to the first person speaker: 'this'), quello (for items near or related to an eventual third person: 'that'), and codesto (for items near or related to an eventual second person). The usage has undergone a simplification, including the meaning of codesto in quello, and only Tuscan speakers still use codesto. Its use is very rare in modern language, and the word has acquired a rather pejorative connotation.

== Pronouns ==
Italian features a sizeable set of pronouns. Personal pronouns are inflected for person, number, case, and, in the third person, gender. Literary subject pronouns also have a distinction between animate (egli, ella) and inanimate (esso, essa) antecedents, although this is lost in colloquial usage, where lui, lei, and loro are the most used forms for animate subjects, while no specific pronoun is employed for inanimate subjects (if needed, demonstrative pronouns such as questo or quello may be used). There is also the uninflected pronoun ciò, which is only used with abstract antecedents.

Personal pronouns are normally omitted in the subject, as the conjugation is usually enough to determine the grammatical person. They are used when some emphasis is needed, e.g. sono italiano ('I am Italian') vs. io sono italiano ('I [specifically, as opposed to others] am Italian').

The words ci, vi and ne act both as personal pronouns (respectively instrumental and genitive case) and clitic pro-forms for "there" (ci and vi, with identical meaning—as in c'è, ci sono, v'è, vi sono, ci vengo, etc.) and "from there" (ne—as in: è entrato in casa alle 10:00 e ne è uscito alle 11:00).

Personal pronouns
			Nominative	Genitive		Dative			Accusative		Instrumental		
			Nominative	Clitic form (Note: Often elided to m', t', l', c', etc. (except loro) before vowels (especially i) and h in colloquial speech, especially in central and southern Italy, and less often in written language. The extent to which individual pronouns are elided varies, ranging from virtually always (lo and la) to rarely (ne).)	Stressed form	Clitic form I. (Note: Alone, as in Ti do un libro, and sometimes with other clitic pronouns (see below))	Clitic form II. (Note: Sometimes before other clitic pronouns (see below), as in Te lo do)	Stressed form	Clitic form (Note: When unstressed accusative pronouns are used in compound tenses, the final vowel of the past participle must agree in gender and number with the accusative pronoun. For example, Hai comprato i cocomeri e le mele? ("Did you buy the watermelons and the apples?") – Li [i cocomeri] ho comprati ma non le [le mele] ho comprate ("I bought them [the former] but I did not buy them [the latter]"). This also happens when the underlying pronoun is made opaque by elision: l'ho svegliato ("I woke him up"), versus L'ho svegliata ("I woke her up").)	Stressed form (Note: The stressed form of the accusative also acts as the prepositional object.)	Clitic form I. (Note: Alone, as in Ci chiacchiero volentieri ("I am happy to chat with him/her"), and sometimes with other clitic pronouns (see below))	Clitic form II. (Note: Sometimes before other clitic pronouns (see below), as in: – Vedresti Carla con una gonna lunga e un cappello? – Sì, ce la vedrei.)	Stressed form
sg.	1st		io	—N/a	di me	mi	me	a me	mi	me	—N/a	—N/a	con me
sg.	2nd		tu (Note: Informal (see below))	—N/a	di te	ti	te	a te	ti	te	—N/a	—N/a	con te
sg.	3rd	m.	egli, esso, (Note: Although traditionally impersonal, essa is occasionally seen used as a personal pronoun, which is never the case with esso; the plurals essi and esse are more frequently used as personal pronouns than their singular counterparts as they commonly supplant the personal plural pronouns elli and elle in contemporary usage.) lui (Note: Previously only accusative, today lui, lei and loro are also accepted as nominative.)	ne	di lui, di esso	gli	glie- (Note: Combines with the following pronoun to form one word; compare Gliene sono grato with Te ne sono grato. Only possible with lo, la, li, le, and ne (see below) to form glielo, gliela, glieli, gliele, and gliene.)	a lui, a esso	lo	lui, esso	ci	ce	con lui, con esso
sg.	3rd	f.	ella, (Note: Lei, Loro, Essi, Esse and traditionally Ella and Elle (spelled this way) are also used as formal second-person pronouns (see below).) essa, lei	ne	di lei, di essa	le	glie-	a lei, a essa	la	lei, essa	ci	ce	con lei, con essa
sg.	3rd	refl.	—N/a	ne	di sé	si	se	a sé	si	sé	ci	ce	con sé
pl.	1st		noi	—N/a	di noi	ci	ce	a noi	ci	noi	—N/a	—N/a	con noi
pl.	2nd		voi	—N/a	di voi	vi	ve	a voi	vi	voi	—N/a	—N/a	con voi
pl.	3rd	m.	elli, (Note: The plural forms of egli and ella are generally considered archaic, owing to: common supplantation by essi and esse respectively; and the rarity of even the singular pronouns in vernacular usage.) essi, loro	ne	di loro, di essi (Note: When a distinction is made between egli / ella (animate) and esso/a (inanimate), in the nominative case essi/e is usually the plural of both the animate and the inanimate pronouns. However, in the accusative, as well as the object of prepositions (as in di lui / di lei, di esso/a), essi/e can be used only for inanimate nouns, while loro must be used for animate nouns instead.)	loro (Note: Not used like most clitics, simply follows the verb as with normal nouns. Compare Gli dico (3rd person m. sg., clitic form I.) with Dico loro (3rd person m. and f. pl.) and Gliene do due (3rd person m. and f. sg., clitic form II.) with Ne do loro due (3rd person m. and f. pl.).) (Note: In spoken Italian, gli ("to him") and glie- ("to him/her") are often used as the plural ("to them") instead of classical loro. So: Conosci Luca: gli ho sempre detto di stare lontano dalle cattive compagnie ("You know Luca: I have always told him to stay away from bad companies") and: Conosci Luca e Gino: gli ho sempre detto... ("...I have always told them...") instead of ... ho sempre detto loro di stare.... It also works in the feminine: Conosci Lucia e Gina: gli ho sempre detto... instead of the more classical ... ho detto loro.... However, classical loro is normally never replaced with gli/glie- in written language.)		a loro, a essi	li	loro, essi	ci	ce	con loro, con essi
pl.	3rd	f.	elle, esse, loro	ne	di loro, di esse	loro		a loro, a esse	le	loro, esse	ci	ce	con loro, con esse
pl.	3rd	refl.	—N/a	ne	di sé	si	se	a sé	si	sé	ci	ce	con sé

Possessive pronouns
		Singular		Plural	
		Masculine	Feminine	Masculine	Feminine
sg.	1st	mio	mia	miei	mie
sg.	2nd	tuo	tua	tuoi	tue
sg.	3rd	suo	sua	suoi	sue
pl.	1st	nostro	nostra	nostri	nostre
pl.	2nd	vostro	vostra	vostri	vostre
pl.	3rd	loro			

Relative pronouns (Note: Che and cui can always be replaced with the pro-form il quale / la quale (gendered), which is always stressed.)
	Nominative/ Accusative	Genitive		Dative		Instrumental
	Clitic form (Note: Differently from personal pronouns, clitic forms of relative pronouns do not rely on the verb for their accent, but might use the accent of any other part of speech instead. Compare ne ho studiato a fondo le parti più rilevanti ("I have studied the most relevant parts of it in depth"), where ne (personal pronoun, genitive) must rely on the verb ho for its accent, with le cui parti più rilevanti ho studiato a fondo ("whose most relevant parts I have studied in depth"), where cui (relative pronoun, genitive) relies on the noun parti for its accent.)	Clitic form	Stressed form	Clitic form	Stressed form	Stressed form
sg./pl.	che	cui (Note: Always positioned between the article and the noun, as in Ieri lì sedeva un uomo il cui sguardo rivelava una certa malinconia. ("Yesterday a man was sitting there, whose look revealed some sort of melancholia"), or Fu un virtuosissimo violinista, la cui fama ancora riecheggia tra le sale da concerto. ("He was a virtuoso violinist, whose fame still echoes among concert halls.")) (Note: Cui (by itself) also acts as the prepositional object (as in per cui). Note that as the prepositional object cui is always stressed.)	di cui	cui (Note: Example: L'unica persona cui confessai tutti i miei segreti adesso mi odia. ("The only person to whom I confessed all my secrets now hates me."))	a cui	con cui

Local case pro-forms
Locative, Lative (Note: As in c'è, vi sono ("There is/are), Ce l'ha messo ("He/she put it there), etc.)			Ablative (Note: As in Ne sono uscito alle... ("I left (from) there at..."))	
Clitic form I.	Clitic form II.	Stressed form	Clitic form	Stressed form
ci, vi	ce, ve	qui, qua / lì, là	ne	da qui, da qua / da lì, da là

=== Clitic pronouns ===
Although objects come after the verb as a rule, this is often not the case with a class of unstressed clitic pro-forms.

Clitic pronouns are replaced with the stressed form for emphatic reasons. A somewhat similar situation is represented by the dative shift in English ditransitive verbs. Compare, for example, (emphasis in italic) "John gave a book to her" with "John gave her a book". In Italian these two different emphases map respectively to "John diede un libro a lei" (stressed form) and "John le diede un libro" (clitic form). Compared to English, Italian presents a richer set of cases.

Clitic pronouns generally come before the verb, but in certain types of constructions, such as lo devo fare, they can also appear as enclitics (attached to the verb itself)—in this case, devo farlo. In the infinitive, gerund and, except with third-person courtesy forms, imperative moods clitic pronouns must always be compound to the suffix as enclitics (as in confessalo! [2p. sg.]/confessiamolo! [1p. pl.]/confessatelo! [2p. pl.], ricordandolo and mangiarlo).

Examples of clitic pronouns
	Italian	English
Genitive	Non vedo Francesca, ma ne vedo la bicicletta.	I don't see Francesca, but I see her bike (the bike of her).
Dative	Gli parlai per un'ora intera.	I spoke to him for a whole hour.
Accusative	La vedo.	I see her.
Instrumental	Sì! Lo conosco! Una volta ci giocai a pallacanestro!	Yes! I know him! Long ago I played basketball with him!

Other examples:

accusative	Davide la lascia in ufficio.	(David leaves it in the office.)
dative + accusative + nominative	Davide me la lascia.	(David leaves me it.)
dative + accusative + nominative	Davide te ne lascia una.	(David leaves (to) you one of them.)
accusative + nominative + dative	Davide la lascia a me.	(David leaves it to me.)
accusative + nominative + dative	Davide ne lascia una a te.	(David leaves one of them (to) you.)
(subjunctive +) infinitive + dative + accusative	Davide potrebbe lasciargliene una.	(David might leave one of them to him/her/it.)
dative + accusative + subjunctive (+ infinitive)	Davide gliene potrebbe lasciare una.	(David might leave one of them to him/her/it.)

(Compare with the similar use of objective pronouns and pro-forms in French and Catalan.)

Finally, in the imperative mood, the objective pronouns come once again after the verb, but this time as a suffix:

imperative + accusative	"Lasciala in ufficio!"	("Leave it in the office!")
imperative + dative + accusative	"Lasciamela!"	("Leave it to me!"/"Leave me it!")
(conditional +) infinitive + dative	"Davide potrebbe lasciarla in ufficio."	(David might leave it in the office.)
negative imperative + dative + accusative	"Non lasciargliela!"	("Do not leave it to/for him/her/it/them!")
imperative + dative + accusative	"Davide dovrebbe lasciargliela."	("David should leave it to/for him/her/it/them.")

- Stressed forms of all four non-subject cases are used when emphasized (e.g. uccidi me, non lui ("kill me, not him"), dallo a lei ("give it to her"), lo farò con lui ("I'll do it with that"), etc.).
- In colloquial speech, form I. of the dative (mi, ti, gli, le, si, ci, vi) is often associated with the emphasized form of the dative (a me, a te, a lui, a lei, a sé, a noi, a voi, a loro) in such a way: a me mi danno un libro ("they give me a book"), a loro gli hanno venduto una casa ("they sold them a house"). Although widely used, this redundant usage is considered non-standard.

==== Combinations of clitics ====
In Italian it is possible to append more than one clitic to a single verb. In normal usage, two is the usual limit, although clusters of three can occasionally arise for some speakers, especially with impersonal constructs (e.g. Ce la si sente = "One feels up to it", or Nessuno ha ancora visto l'ultimo film di Woody Allen, quindi ce lo si vede tutti insieme! = "Nobody has watched the last Woody Allen movie yet, so we have to watch it together!"). Any two cases can be used together, except for accusative + genitive, and word order is strictly determined according to one of the following two patterns:

1. When third-person non-reflexive accusative or genitive clitics are used, form II. of the other clitic is used, which always precedes it. Thus:
2. 1	2	3
  me, te, glie-, se, ce, ve	lo, la, li, le	ne si (Note: Impersonal si; used to form quasi-passive constructions and essentially the same case as the pronoun that precedes it: Lo si vede spesso = "You/we/one see(s) him a lot" (lit. more like "He is seen a lot"). Se is used with ne instead, however: Se ne parla = "You talk about it". Cannot be used with stressed form of other clitics; used with unstressed form otherwise (see below).)
3. For example:
  - Ve lo dico già da ora: io non verrò! = "I already told you [pl.] (said it to you): I'm not coming!" (dative + accusative)
  - Ce li ha già dati = "He/she/you already gave them to us" (dative + accusative)
  - Ecco l'uomo di cui mi innamorai! Te ne ho portato la foto! = "Here's the man I fell in love with! I brought you the picture (of him)!" (dative + genitive)
  - Vedresti Carla con una gonna lunga e un cappello? – Sì, ce la vedrei = "Could you imagine Carla with a long skirt and a hat? – Yes, I could imagine her with that" (instrumental + accusative)
  - Riuscirai a trasportare abbastanza mele con quel piccolo furgoncino? – Uomo di poca fede! Ce ne trasporterò quintali! = "Will you be able to transport enough apples with such a small van? – Man of little faith! I'll transport quintals of them (with it)!" (instrumental + genitive)
4. Otherwise, form I. is used for both clitics:
5. 1	2	3	4	5	6
  mi	gli, le	vi	ti	ci	si (Note: Reflexive or impersonal)
6. Thus:
  - Mi ti mostro senza veli = "I'm showing myself without veils to you" (accusative + dative)
  - Ti si fece incontro = "He/she approached you (moved himself/herself to you)" (dative + accusative)
  - [G]li ti darò nelle mani, perché in pezzi ti faccia come tu meriti = "I will deliver you to him, so that he will tear you to pieces as you deserve" (dative + accusative)
  - Marco ha vinto! Che farà con tutti quei soldi? – Ci si pagherà l'Università = "Marco won! What's he going to do with all that money? – He'll use it to pay for college (pay for college for himself with it)" (instrumental + dative)
  - Metti via quella pistola! Ti ci ammazzi! = "Put away that pistol! You'll use it to kill yourself (kill yourself with it)!" (accusative + instrumental)

==== Apocopated forms ====
Clitic forms (except cui) before a verbal form beginning with a vowel (except when they are compound to the suffix) can be apocopated; apocopations are more common before verbal forms è, ho, hai, ha, hanno, abbia, and abbiano of verbs essere and avere, than when they are before verbal forms of other verbs, which are more rare, also apocopations of che are rare, while apocopation of cui is avoided due to phonetic ambiguities with words such as qua (homophone to cu'ha). Apocopation is not mandatory. Ci is graphically apocopated only in front of "e" and "i" (as in c'è and c'inserisco), but the "i" is graphically kept in front of other vowels (as in mi ci addentro), although in all cases it is pronounced /t͡ʃ/ (without the "i"); similarly gli is graphically apocopated only in front of "i" (as in gl'impongo) but not in front of other vowels (gli è dato sapere), although in all cases the "i" is never pronounced. The apocopated form of che is always pronounced /k/, even when otherwise common phonetic rules switch their pronunciations.

Examples of apocopated forms
clitic form	è (Note: "(he/she/it/one) is")	ho (Note: "(I) have")	hai (Note: "(you [sg.]) have")	ha (Note: "(he/she/it/one) has")	abbiamo (Note: "(we) have")	avete (Note: "(you [pl.]) have)	hanno (Note: "(they) have")
mi	m'è	m'ho (Note: apocopated of reflexive pronouns with verbal forms of verb avere (ho, hai, ...) are rarely used.)	m'hai	m'ha	—N/a	m'avete	m'hanno
ti	t'è	t'ho	t'hai	t'ha	t'abbiamo	—N/a	t'hanno
gli	gli è	gli ho	gli hai	gli ha	gli abbiamo	gli avete	gli hanno
gliela/gliele/glieli/glielo	gliel'è	gliel'ho	gliel'hai	gliel'ha	gliel'abbiamo	gliel'avete	gliel'hanno
la/le/li/lo	l'è	l'ho	l'hai	l'ha	l'abbiamo	l'avete	l'hanno
si	s'è	—N/a	—N/a	s'ha	—N/a	—N/a	s'hanno
ci	c'è	ci ho	ci hai	ci ha	ci abbiamo	ci avete	ci hanno
vi	v'è	v'ho	v'hai	v'ha	v'abbiamo	v'avete	v'hanno
che	ch'è	ch'ho	ch'hai	ch'ha	ch'abbiamo	ch'avete	ch'hanno

=== T–V distinction ===
Italian makes use of the T–V distinction in second-person address. The second-person nominative pronoun is tu for informal use, and for formal use, the third-person form Lei (and historically Ella) has been used since the Renaissance. It is used like Sie in German, usted in Spanish, and vous in French. Lei was originally an object form of ella, which in turn referred to an honorific of the feminine gender such as la magnificenza tua/vostra ('Your Magnificence') or Vossignoria ('Your Lordship'), and by analogy, Loro came to be used as the formal plural. Previously, and in some Italian regions today (e.g. Campania), voi was used as the formal singular, like French vous. The pronouns lei (third-person singular), Lei (formal second-person singular), loro (third-person plural), and Loro (formal second-person plural) are pronounced the same but written as shown, and formal Lei and Loro take third-person conjugations. Formal Lei is invariable for gender (always feminine), but adjectives that modify it are not: one would say to a man La conosco ('I know you') but Lei è alto ('You are tall'). Formal Loro is variable for gender: Li conosco ('I know you [masc. pl.]') vs. Le conosco ('I know you [fem. pl.]'), etc. The formal plural is very rarely used in modern Italian; the unmarked form is widely used instead. For example: Gino, Lei è un bravo ingegnere. Marco, Lei è un bravo architetto. Insieme, voi sarete una gran bella squadra. ("Gino, you are a good engineer. Marco, you are a good architect. Together, you will make a very good team.").

== Verbs ==
Based on the ending of their infiniti presenti (-are, -ere, or -ire), all Italian verbs can be assigned to three distinct conjugation patterns. Exceptions are found: fare, 'to do/make' (from Latin facere), and dire, 'to say' (from Latin dīcere), were originally 2nd conjugation verbs that reduced the unstressed vowel in the infinitive (and consequentially in the future and conditional, whose stem derives from the infinitive), but still follow the 2nd conjugation for all the other tenses; this behaviour is similarly featured in the verbs ending in -trarre, -porre and -durre, derived respectively from the Latin trahere ('to drag'), pōnere ('to put'), and dūcere ('to lead').

Just like many other Romance languages, Italian verbs express distinct verbal aspects by means of analytic structures such as periphrases, rather than synthetic ones; the only aspectual distinction between two synthetic forms is the one between the imperfetto (habitual past tense) and the passato remoto (perfective past tense), although the latter is usually replaced in spoken language by the passato prossimo.

=== Tenses ===
==== Simple tenses ====
Tense	Italian name	Example	English equivalent
Indicative Mood
Present	indicativo presente	faccio	I do I am doing (Note: While Italian features a series of periphrastic progressive tenses grammatically distinct from the unmarked forms, the present and past continuous are used less frequently than in English, and can generally be replaced with the respective simple forms. This cannot necessarily apply to all other progressive tenses.)
Imperfect	indicativo imperfetto	facevo	I used to do I was doing
Preterite (Note: In northern Italy and in Sardinia, the preterite is usually perceived as formal, and in informal or everyday language is usually replaced by the present perfect (ho fatto); it is however regularly used in southern Italy, and also commonly found in both older and more recent literature.)	passato remoto	feci	I did
Future	futuro semplice	farò	I will do
Conditional mood
Present	condizionale presente	farei	I would do
Subjunctive mood
Present	congiuntivo presente	(che) io faccia	(that) I do
Imperfect	congiuntivo imperfetto	(che) io facessi	(that) I did/do
Imperative mood
Present	imperativo	fa'!	(you) do!

==== Compound tenses ====
Aspects other than the habitual and the imperfective, such as the perfective, the progressive and the prospective, are rendered in Italian by a series of periphrastic structures that may or may not be perceived as different tenses by different speakers. Note the difference between:

- Perfect aspect: io ho fatto ("I have done")
- Progressive aspect: io sto facendo ("I'm doing")
- Prospective aspect: io sto per fare ("I'm about to do")

Tense	Italian name	Example	English equivalent
Indicative Mood
Present perfect	passato prossimo	ho fatto	I have done I did
Recent pluperfect	trapassato prossimo	avevo fatto	I had done (Note: The trapassato prossimo (recent pluperfect) and the more uncommon trapassato remoto (remote pluperfect), while separate tenses in Italian, translate the same English tense, the past perfect; the difference in usage between the two mirrors the one between the present perfect and the preterite.)
Remote pluperfect	trapassato remoto	ebbi fatto	I had done
Future perfect	futuro anteriore	avrò fatto	I will have done I may have done
Present continuous	presente progressivo	sto facendo	I am doing
Past continuous	passato progressivo	stavo facendo	I was doing
Future continuous	futuro progressivo	starò facendo	I will be doing I may be doing
Conditional mood
Preterite	condizionale passato	avrei fatto	I would have done
Present continuous	condizionale progressivo	starei facendo	I would be doing
Subjunctive mood
Preterite	congiuntivo passato	(che) io abbia fatto	(that) I have done
Pluperfect	congiuntivo trapassato	(che) io avessi fatto	(that) I had done
Present continuous	congiuntivo presente progressivo	(che) io stia facendo	(that) I be doing
Imperfect continuous	congiuntivo imperfetto progressivo	(che) io stessi facendo	(that) I were doing

==== Impersonal forms ====
Tense	Italian name	Example	English equivalent
Infinitives
Present	infinito presente	fare	to do
Past	infinito passato	aver fatto	to have done
Gerunds
Present	gerundio presente	facendo	doing
Past	gerundio passato	avendo fatto	having done
Participles
Present	participio presente	facente	doing
Past	participio passato	fatto	done

=== Compound tense auxiliary verbs ===
In Italian, compound tenses expressing perfect aspect are formed with either auxiliary verb avere ('to have') for transitive verbs and some intransitive verbs and with essere ('to be') for the remaining intransitive verbs, plus the past participle. Progressive aspect is rendered by verb stare plus the gerund. The prospective aspect is formed with stare plus the preposition per and the infinitive.

The passive voice of transitive verbs is formed with essere in the perfective and prospective aspects, with venire in the progressive or habitual aspect, and with either essere or venire in the perfective aspects:

- Il cancello è stato appena aperto. ("The gate has just been opened.")
- Il cancello sta per essere aperto ("The gate is about to be opened.")
- Il cancello sta venendo aperto in questo momento. ("The gate is being opened right now.")
- Il cancello viene aperto ogni giorno. ("The gate is opened every day.")
- Il cancello fu/venne aperto in fretta. ("The gate was quickly opened.")

For the perfect tenses of intransitive verbs a reliable rule cannot be given, although a useful rule of thumb is that if a verb's past participle can take on adjectival value, essere is used, otherwise avere. Also, reflexive verbs and unaccusative verbs use essere (typically non-agentive verbs of motion and change of state, i.e. involuntary actions such as cadere ('to fall') or morire ('to die')).

The distinction between the two auxiliary verbs is important for the correct formation of the compound tenses and is essential to the agreement of the past participle. Some verbs, such as vivere ('to live'), may use both: Io ho vissuto ('I have lived') can alternatively be expressed as, Io sono vissuto.

=== Past participle ===
The past participle is used in Italian as both an adjective and to form many of the compound tenses of the language. There are regular endings for the past participle, based on the conjugation class (see below). There are, however, many irregular forms as not all verbs follow the pattern, particularly the -ere verbs. Some of the more common irregular past participles include: essere ('to be') → stato (same for stare); fare ('to do', 'to make') → fatto; dire ('to say, to tell') → detto; aprire ('to open') → aperto; chiedere ('to ask') → chiesto; chiudere ('to close') → chiuso; leggere ('to read') → letto; mettere ('to put') → messo; perdere ('to lose') → perso; prendere ('to take', 'to get') → preso; rispondere ('to answer') → risposto; scrivere ('to write') → scritto; vedere ('to see') → visto.

For the intransitive verbs taking essere, the past participle always agrees with the subject—that is, it follows the usual adjective agreement rules: egli è partito; ella è partita. This is also true for reflexive verbs, the impersonal si construction (which requires any adjectives that refer to it to be in the masculine plural: Si è sempre stanchi alla fine della giornata – One is always tired at the end of the day), and the passive voice, which also use essere (Queste mele sono state comprate da loro – These apples have been bought by them, against Essi hanno comprato queste mele – They bought these apples).

The past participle when used with avere never changes to agree with the subject. It must agree with the object, although, in sentences where this is expressed by a third person clitic pronoun (e.g. Hai mangiato la mela? – Sì, l'ho mangiata (Have you eaten the apple? – Yes, I have eaten it)). When the object is expressed by a first or second person clitic pronoun instead, the agreement is optional: Maria! Ti ha chiamato / chiamata Giovanni? – No, non mi ha chiamato / chiamata (Maria! Has Giovanni called you? – No, he has not).

In all the other cases where the object is not expressed by a clitic pronoun, the agreement with the object is obsolescent in modern Italian (but still correct): La storia che avete raccontata (obsolete) / raccontato non mi convince (The story you told does not convince me); or compare Manzoni's Lucia aveva avute due buone ragioni with the more modern Lucia aveva avuto due buone ragioni (Lucia had had two good reasons).

=== Tense relationship in subordinate sentences ===
Italian inherits consecutio temporum, a grammar rule from Latin that governs the relationship between the tenses in principal and subordinate clauses. Consecutio temporum has very rigid rules. These rules require the subjunctive tense in order to express contemporaneity, posteriority and anteriority in relation with the principal clause.

- To express contemporaneity when the principal clause is in a simple tense (future, present, or simple past), the subordinate clause uses the present subjunctive, to express contemporaneity in the present.
  - Penso che Davide sia intelligente. I think David is smart.
- When the principal clause has a past imperfect or perfect, the subordinate clause uses the imperfect subjunctive, expressing contemporaneity in the past.
  - Pensavo che Davide fosse intelligente. I thought David was smart.
- To express anteriority when the principal clause is in a simple tense (future, or present or passato prossimo) the subordinate clause uses the past subjunctive.
  - Penso che Davide sia stato intelligente. I think David has been smart.
- To express anteriority when the principal clause has a past imperfect or perfect, the subjunctive has to be pluperfect.
  - Pensavo che Davide fosse stato intelligente. I thought David had been smart.
- To express posteriority the subordinate clause uses the future tense in the indicative mood, not the subjunctive, because the subjunctive has no future tense.
  - Penso che Davide sarà intelligente. I think David will be smart.
- To express posteriority with respect to a past event, the subordinate clause uses the past conditional, whereas in other European languages (such as French, English, and Spanish) the present conditional is used.
  - Pensavo che Davide sarebbe stato intelligente. I thought that David would have been smart.

=== Regular conjugation ===
The infinitive of first conjugation verbs ends in -are, that of second conjugation verbs in -ere, and that of third conjugation verbs in -ire. In the following examples for different moods, the first conjugation verb is parlare ('to talk/speak'), the second conjugation verb is temere ('to fear') and the third conjugation verb is partire ('to leave/depart').

==== Indicative mood ====
	Present			Preterite			Imperfect			Simple future		
	1st Conj.	2nd Conj.	3rd Conj.	1st Conj.	2nd Conj.	3rd Conj.	1st Conj.	2nd Conj.	3rd Conj.	1st Conj.	2nd Conj.	3rd Conj.
io	parlo	temo	parto	parlai	temetti; temei	partii	parlavo	temevo	partivo	parlerò	temerò	partirò
tu	parli	temi	parti	parlasti	temesti	partisti	parlavi	temevi	partivi	parlerai	temerai	partirai
egli, ella, esso/essa	parla	teme	parte	parlò	temette; temé	partì	parlava	temeva	partiva	parlerà	temerà	partirà
noi	parliamo	temiamo	partiamo	parlammo	tememmo	partimmo	parlavamo	temevamo	partivamo	parleremo	temeremo	partiremo
voi	parlate	temete	partite	parlaste	temeste	partiste	parlavate	temevate	partivate	parlerete	temerete	partirete
essi/esse	parlano	temono	partono	parlarono	temettero; temerono	partirono	parlavano	temevano	partivano	parleranno	temeranno	partiranno
	Recent past = present of avere/essere + past participle			Remote pluperfect = preterite of avere/essere + past participle			Recent pluperfect = imperfect of avere/essere + past participle			Future perfect = simple future of avere/essere + past participle		

Many third conjugation verbs insert an infix -sc- between the stem and the endings in the first, second, and third persons singular and third person plural of the present indicative and subjunctive, e.g. capire > capisco, capisci, capisce, capiamo, capite, capiscono (indicative) and capisca, capisca, capisca, capiamo, capiate, capiscano (subjunctive). This subgroup of third conjugation verbs is usually referred to as incoativi, because in Latin the original function of the suffix -sc- was to denote inchoative verbs, but this meaning is totally lost in modern Italian, where the suffix mostly serves a euphonic function.

==== Subjunctive mood ====
The Italian subjunctive mood is used to indicate cases of desire, express doubt, make impersonal emotional statements, and to talk about impending events.

	Present			Imperfect		
	1st Conj.	2nd Conj.	3rd Conj.	1st Conj.	2nd Conj.	3rd Conj.
io	parli	tema	parta	parlassi	temessi	partissi
tu	parli	tema	parta	parlassi	temessi	partissi
egli, ella, esso/essa	parli	tema	parta	parlasse	temesse	partisse
noi	parliamo	temiamo	partiamo	parlassimo	temessimo	partissimo
voi	parliate	temiate	partiate	parlaste	temeste	partiste
essi/esse	parlino	temano	partano	parlassero	temessero	partissero
	Past = present of avere/essere + past participle			Past perfect = imperfect of avere/essere + past participle		

- Third conjugation verbs, such as capire, mentioned above insert -isc- in the first, second, and third persons singular and third person plural of the present.
- Compound forms (past and past perfect) are made by adding the past participle (e.g. parlato) to the corresponding auxiliary form (as abbia) in the present and imperfect.

==== Conditional mood ====
	Present		
	1st Conj.	2nd Conj.	3rd Conj.
io	parlerei	temerei	partirei
tu	parleresti	temeresti	partiresti
egli, ella, esso/essa	parlerebbe	temerebbe	partirebbe
noi	parleremmo	temeremmo	partiremmo
voi	parlereste	temereste	partireste
essi/esse	parlerebbero	temerebbero	partirebbero
	Past = conditional of avere/essere + past participle		

As the table shows, verbs each take their own root from their class of verb: -are becomes -er-, -ere becomes -er-, and -ire becomes -ir-, the same roots as used in the future indicative tense. All verbs add the same ending to this root.

Some verbs do not follow this pattern, but take irregular roots, these include: Andare ('to go') ~ Andr-, Avere ('to have') ~ Avr-, Bere ('to drink') ~ Berr-, Dare ('to give') ~ Dar-, Dovere ('to have to') ~ Dovr-, Essere ('to be') ~ Sar-, Fare ('to make/do') ~ Far-, Godere ('to enjoy') ~ Godr-, Potere ('to be able to') ~ Potr-, Rimanere ('to remain') ~ Rimarr-, Sapere ('to know') ~ Sapr-, Sedere ('to sit') ~ Sedr-, Stare ('to be/feel') ~ Star-, Tenere ('to hold') ~ Terr-, Vedere ('to see') ~ Vedr-, Venire ('to come') ~ Verr-, Vivere ('to live') ~ Vivr-, Volere ('to want') ~ Vorr- etc.

The Italian conditional mood is a mood that refers to an action that is possible or probable, but is dependent upon a condition. Example:

Io andrei in spiaggia, ma fa troppo freddo.	("I would go to the beach, but it is too cold.")

It can be used in two tenses, the present, by conjugation of the appropriate verb, or the past, using the auxiliary conjugated in the conditional, with the past participle of the appropriate noun:

Mangerei un sacco adesso, se non stessi cercando di fare colpo su queste ragazze.	("I would eat a lot now, if I were not trying to impress these girls.")
Sarei andato in città, se avessi saputo che ci andavano loro.	("I would have gone to the city, if I had known that they were going.")

Many Italian speakers often use the imperfect instead of the conditional and subjunctive. Prescriptivists usually view this as incorrect, but it is frequent in colloquial speech and tolerated in all but high registers and in most writing:

Se lo sapevo, andavo in spiaggia	("If I had known it, I would have gone to the beach.")
Se Lucia non faceva quel segno, la risposta sarebbe probabilmente stata diversa.	("If Lucia had not made that sign, the answer would probably have been different.")

The conditional can also be used in Italian to express "could", with the conjugated forms of potere ('to be able to'), "should", with the conjugated forms of dovere ('to have to'), or "would like", with the conjugated forms of volere ('want'):

[Lui] potrebbe leggere un libro.	("He could read a book.")
[Loro] dovrebbero andare a letto.	("They should go to bed.")
Vorrei un bicchiere d'acqua, per favore.	("I would like a glass of water, please.")

==== Imperative mood ====
	1st Conj.	2nd Conj.	3rd Conj.
(tu)	parla!	temi!	parti!
(Ella)	parli!	tema!	parta!
(noi)	parliamo!	temiamo!	partiamo!
(voi)	parlate!	temete!	partite!
(Essi/Esse)	parlino!	temano!	partano!

Verbs such as capire insert -isc- in all except the noi and voi forms. Technically, the only real imperative forms are the second-person singular and plural, with the other persons being borrowed from the present subjunctive.

==== Non-finite forms ====
- Infinitive: present: -are, -ere, -ire; past: avere/essere + past participle
- Gerund: present: -ando, -endo, -endo; past: avendo/essendo + past participle
- Participle: present: -ante, -ente, -ente; past: -ato, -uto (although verbs of the second conjugation almost always have a contracted desinence, e.g. cuocere ('to cook') cotto ('cooked')), -ito

=== Irregular verbs ===
While the majority of Italian verbs are regular, many of the most commonly used are irregular. In particular, the auxiliary verbs essere, stare and avere, and the common modal verbs dovere (expressing necessity or obligation), potere (expressing permission and to a lesser degree ability), sapere (expressing ability) and volere (expressing willingness) are all irregular.

The only irregular verbs of the first conjugation are dare ('to give'), which follows the same pattern as stare, and andare ('to go'), which features suppletive forms in the present of the indicative, subjunctive and imperative from the Latin verb VADERE. While apparently a 1st conjugation verb, fare is actually a highly irregular verb of the second conjugation. Even the third conjugation features a small handful of irregular verbs, such as morire ('to die'), whose present is muoio, muori, muore, moriamo, morite, muoiono (indicative) and muoia, muoia, muoia, moriamo, moriate, muoiano (subjunctive).

The second conjugation combines the second and third conjugation of Latin; since the verbs belonging to the third conjugation were athematic, and they behaved less regularly than the ones belonging to the other conjugations (compare AMĀRE > AMAVI, AMATVS, first conjugation, and LEGĚRE > LEGI, LECTVS, third conjugation), the second conjugation Italian features many irregularities that trace back to the original paradigms of the Latin verbs: amare > amai, amato (first conjugation, regular), but leggere > lessi, letto (second conjugation, irregular).

essere (to be; auxiliary)
	Indicative				Subjunctive		Conditional
	Present	Imperfect	Preterite	Future	Present	Imperfect	Conditional
io	sono	ero	fui	sarò	sia	fossi	sarei
tu	sei	eri	fosti	sarai	sia	fossi	saresti
lui, lei, esso/essa	è	era	fu	sarà	sia	fosse	sarebbe
noi	siamo	eravamo	fummo	saremo	siamo	fossimo	saremmo
voi	siete	eravate	foste	sarete	siate	foste	sareste
loro, essi/esse	sono	erano	furono	saranno	siano	fossero	sarebbero

stare (to stay; auxiliary)
	Indicative				Subjunctive		Conditional
	Present	Imperfect	Preterite	Future	Present	Imperfect	Conditional
io	sto	stavo	stetti	starò	stia	stessi	starei
tu	stai	stavi	stesti	starai	stia	stessi	staresti
lui, lei, esso/essa	sta	stava	stette	starà	stia	stesse	starebbe
noi	stiamo	stavamo	stemmo	staremo	stiamo	stessimo	staremmo
voi	state	stavate	steste	starete	stiate	steste	stareste
loro, essi/esse	stanno	stavano	stettero	staranno	stiano	stessero	starebbero

avere (to have; auxiliary)
	Indicative				Subjunctive		Conditional
	Present	Imperfect	Preterite	Future	Present	Imperfect	Conditional
io	ho	avevo	ebbi	avrò	abbia	avessi	avrei
tu	hai	avevi	avesti	avrai	abbia	avessi	avresti
lui, lei, esso/essa	ha	aveva	ebbe	avrà	abbia	avesse	avrebbe
noi	abbiamo	avevamo	avemmo	avremo	abbiamo	avessimo	avremmo
voi	avete	avevate	aveste	avrete	abbiate	aveste	avreste
loro, essi/esse	hanno	avevano	ebbero	avranno	abbiano	avessero	avrebbero

dovere (to have to, must, should; modal)
	Indicative				Subjunctive		Conditional
	Present	Imperfect	Preterite	Future	Present	Imperfect	Conditional
io	devo/debbo	dovevo	dovetti	dovrò	debba	dovessi	dovrei
tu	devi	dovevi	dovesti	dovrai	debba	dovessi	dovresti
lui, lei, esso/essa	deve	doveva	dovette	dovrà	debba	dovesse	dovrebbe
noi	dobbiamo	dovevamo	dovemmo	dovremo	dobbiamo	dovessimo	dovremmo
voi	dovete	dovevate	doveste	dovrete	dobbiate	doveste	dovreste
loro, essi/esse	devono/debbono	dovevano	dovettero	dovranno	debbano	dovessero	dovrebbero

potere (to be able to, can, could; modal)
	Indicative				Subjunctive		Conditional
	Present	Imperfect	Preterite	Future	Present	Imperfect	Conditional
io	posso	potevo	potei	potrò	possa	potessi	potrei
tu	puoi	potevi	potesti	potrai	possa	potessi	potresti
lui, lei, esso/essa	può	poteva	poté	potrà	possa	potesse	potrebbe
noi	possiamo	potevamo	potemmo	potremo	possiamo	potessimo	potremmo
voi	potete	potevate	poteste	potrete	possiate	poteste	potreste
loro, essi/esse	possono	potevano	poterono	potranno	possano	potessero	potrebbero

volere (to want, will, would; modal)
	Indicative				Subjunctive		Conditional
	Present	Imperfect	Preterite	Future	Present	Imperfect	Conditional
io	voglio	volevo	volli	vorrò	voglia	volessi	vorrei
tu	vuoi	volevi	volesti	vorrai	voglia	volessi	vorresti
lui, lei, esso/essa	vuole	voleva	volle	vorrà	voglia	volesse	vorrebbe
noi	vogliamo	volevamo	volemmo	vorremo	vogliamo	volessimo	vorremmo
voi	volete	volevate	voleste	vorrete	vogliate	voleste	vorreste
loro, essi/esse	vogliono	volevano	vollero	vorranno	vogliano	volessero	vorrebbero

sapere (to be able to, can; modal)
	Indicative				Subjunctive		Conditional
	Present	Imperfect	Preterite	Future	Present	Imperfect	Conditional
io	so	sapevo	seppi	saprò	sappia	sapessi	saprei
tu	sai	sapevi	sapesti	saprai	sappia	sapessi	sapresti
lui, lei, esso/essa	sa	sapeva	seppe	saprà	sappia	sapesse	saprebbe
noi	sappiamo	sapevamo	sapemmo	sapremo	sappiamo	sapessimo	sapremmo
voi	sapete	sapevate	sapeste	saprete	sappiate	sapeste	sapreste
loro, essi/esse	sanno	sapevano	seppero	sapranno	sappiano	sapessero	saprebbero

== Adverbs ==
An adjective can be made into a modal adverb by adding -mente (from Latin mente, ablative of mens ('mind'), feminine noun) to the ending of the feminine singular form of the adjective. E.g. lenta, 'slow' (feminine), becomes lentamente, 'slowly'. Adjectives ending in -re or -le lose their e before adding -mente (facile, 'easy', becomes facilmente, 'easily'; particolare, 'particular', becomes particolarmente, 'particularly').

These adverbs can also be derived from the absolute superlative form of adjectives, e.g. lentissimamente ('very slowly'), facilissimamente ('very easily').

There is also a plethora of temporal, local, modal and interrogative adverbs, mostly derived from Latin, e.g. quando ('when'), dove ('where'), come ('how'), perché ('why/because'), mai ('never'), sempre ('always'), etc.

== Prepositions ==
Italian has a closed class of basic prepositions, to which a number of adverbs can be added that also double as prepositions, e.g.: sopra il tavolo ('upon the table'), prima di adesso ('before now').

In modern Italian the prepositions tra and fra are interchangeable, and often chosen on the basis of euphony: tra fratelli ('among brothers') vs. fra i tralicci ('between the power pylons').

In modern Italian, all the basic prepositions except tra, fra, con, and per have to be combined with an article placed next to them. Of these, con and per have optional combining forms: col, collo, colla, coll', coi, cogli, colle; pel, pello, pella, pell', pei, pegli, pelle; except for col and coi, which are occasionally used, these forms are archaic and very rare.

Prepositions normally require the article before the following noun in a similar way as the English language does. However Latin's lack of articles influenced several cases of prepositions used without article in Italian (e.g. a capo, da capo, di colpo, in bicicletta, per strada).

The preposition su becomes su di before a pronoun (e.g. su di te). Some speakers also use su di before a word beginning in u for euphonic reasons (e.g. su di un cavallo), but this is regarded as incorrect by grammarians. Historically the variant form sur was used before the letter u; however, this form fell into disuse during the nineteenth century.

Mandatory contractions
Italian	English	Preposition + article						
Italian	English	il	lo	la	l'	i	gli	le
di	of, from	del	dello	della	dell'	dei	degli	delle
a	to, at	al	allo	alla	all'	ai	agli	alle
da	from, by, since	dal	dallo	dalla	dall'	dai	dagli	dalle
in	in	nel	nello	nella	nell'	nei	negli	nelle
su	on, about	sul	sullo	sulla	sull'	sui	sugli	sulle

Optional contractions
Italian	English	Preposition + article						
Italian	English	il	lo	la	l'	i	gli	le
con	with	col	collo	colla	coll'	coi	cogli	colle
per	for, through	pel	pello	pella	pell'	pei	pegli	pelle
tra	between, among	tral	trallo	tralla	trall'	trai	tragli	tralle
fra	between, among	fral	frallo	fralla	frall'	frai	fragli	fralle

== Syntax ==
Italian is an SVO language. Nevertheless, the SVO sequence is sometimes replaced by one of the other arrangements (SOV, VSO, OVS, etc.), especially for reasons of emphasis and, in literature, for reasons of style and metre: Italian has relatively free word order.

The subject is usually omitted when it is a pronoun—distinctive verb conjugations make it redundant. Subject pronouns are considered emphatic when used at all.

Questions are formed by a rising intonation at the end of the sentence (in written form, a question mark). There is usually no other special marker, although wh-movement does usually occur. In general, intonation and context are important to recognize questions from affirmative statements.

Davide è arrivato in ufficio.	("David has arrived at the office.")
Davide è arrivato in ufficio?	("Talking about David… did he arrive at the office?" or "Davide has arrived at the office? Really?" – depending on the intonation)
Perché Davide è arrivato in ufficio?	("Why has David arrived at the office?")
Perché Davide è arrivato in ufficio.	("Because David has arrived at the office.")
È arrivato Davide in ufficio.	("It was David who arrived at the office" or "David arrived at the office" – depending on the intonation)
È arrivato Davide in ufficio?	("Has David arrived at the office?")
È arrivato in ufficio.	("He has arrived at the office.")
(Lui) è arrivato in ufficio.	("He has arrived at the office.")
Chi è arrivato in ufficio?	("Who has arrived at the office?")

In general, adjectives come after the noun they modify, adverbs after the verb. But: as with French, adjectives coming before the noun indicate essential quality of the noun. Demonstratives (e.g. questo, 'this', quello, 'that') come before the noun, and a few particular adjectives (e.g. bello) may be inflected like demonstratives and placed before the noun.

== Disputed points in Italian grammar ==
Among sometimes proscribed Italian forms are:

- The usage of an indicative form where a subjunctive one is traditional; for instance: credo che Giorgio ieri fosse a casa ("I believe that yesterday George was at home") is considered proper, while credo che Giorgio ieri era a casa may not be; se Maria fosse stata a casa, le avrei telefonato ("if Mary had been at home, I would have telephoned her") is preferred, se Maria era a casa le telefonavo is often proscribed, despite being found in classic Italian writers.
- The use of the object forms (lui, lei, loro and Lei) of third person pronouns instead of the subject forms (egli, ella, essi, and Ella), which are employed in formal language.
- Ma però, despite being widespread in spoken language, is proscribed in formal usage because it is redundant (ma and però are synonyms).

== Italian grammar books ==
The first Italian grammar was printed by Giovanni Francesco Fortunio in 1516 with the title Regole grammaticali della volgar lingua. Ever since, several Italian and foreign scholars have published works devoted to its description. Among others may be mentioned the famous Grammatica storica della lingua italiana e dei suoi dialetti written by the philologist Gerhard Rohlfs, published at the end of the 1960s.

Among the most modern publications are those by Luca Serianni, in collaboration with Alberto Castelvecchi, Grammatica italiana. Suoni, forme, costrutti (Utet, Turin, 1998); and by Lorenzo Renzi, Giampaolo Salvi and Anna Cardinaletti, Grande grammatica italiana di consultazione (third vol., Bologna, Il Mulino, 1988–1995). The most complete and accurate grammar in English is A Reference Grammar of Modern Italian by Martin Maiden and Cecilia Robustelli (McGraw-Hill, Chicago, 2000; second ed. Routledge, New York, 2013).

== Bibliography ==
- Serianni, Luca (2000). Italiano. Grammatica, sintassi, dubbi (in Italian). Milan: Garzanti. ISBN 8811504880.
- Berloco, Fabrizio (2018). The Big Book of Italian Verbs: 900 Fully Conjugated Verbs in All Tenses. With IPA Transcription, 2nd Edition. Lengu. ISBN 978-8894034813.
