= ATC code A09 =

ATC code A09 Digestives, including enzymes is a therapeutic subgroup of the Anatomical Therapeutic Chemical Classification System, a system of alphanumeric codes developed by the World Health Organization (WHO) for the classification of drugs and other medical products. Subgroup A09 is part of the anatomical group A Alimentary tract and metabolism.

Codes for veterinary use (ATCvet codes) can be created by placing the letter Q in front of the human ATC code: for example, QA09.
National versions of the ATC classification may include additional codes not present in this list, which follows the WHO version.

== A09A Digestives, including enzymes ==
=== A09AA Enzyme preparations ===
A09AA01 Diastase
A09AA02 Multienzymes (lipase, protease, etc.)
A09AA03 Pepsin
A09AA04 Tilactase

=== A09AB Acid preparations ===
A09AB01 Glutamic acid hydrochloride
A09AB02 Betaine hydrochloride
A09AB03 Hydrochloric acid
A09AB04 Citric acid

=== A09AC Enzyme and acid preparations, combinations ===
A09AC01 Pepsin and acid preparations
A09AC02 Multienzymes and acid preparations
