= Plugola =

Plugola is the illicit business practice of endorsing a product or service on radio or television for personal gain, without the consent of the network or stations. "Pluggers" have been known to accept bribes of money, alcohol, or free products and services. This contrasts greatly with commercial sponsorship because the benefits of the endorsement go to the individual talent or programmers, while the stations and networks receive no revenue.

== History ==
In the 1950s, concern over illicit business practices in television and radio including; plugola, payola, and rigged game shows led to congressional and U.S. Federal Communications Commission (FCC) hearings. In 1959, Attorney General William Rogers reported to President Dwight Eisenhower that deceptive and false advertising programming was becoming a trend in the United States, and needed to stop. In that same year, FCC Chairman John Doerfer presented his plan to expand public service programming on television networks. The plan called for some public service programming in prime time slots, which did not occur before this. The networks likely had the same agenda as Doerfer, to regain the respect of the viewers, and agreed to Doerfer's plan. By 1960, amendments were made to the Communications Act of 1934 to punish those who engaged in these illicit acts in the future.

== See also ==
- Radio promotion
- Payola
