= Jean-François Persoz =

French chemist (1805–1868)

Jean-François Persoz (9 June 1805–September 1868) was a French chemist known for discovering the enzyme diastase and on the properties of dextrin. He also wrote a report that coined the name cellulose.

Born in Cortaillod, Persoz studied physical science in Paris under Louis Jacques Thénard and received his doctorate in 1833.

Persoz was a professor of chemistry at the University of Strasbourg since 1833 and then a professor of dyeing and calico-printing at the Conservatoire des Arts et Metiers since 1852.

His work on diastase, also known as amylase, was carried out in collaboration with Anselme Payen and published in 1833. His work on dextrin was carried out in collaboration with J.B. Biot

Persoz died in Paris on 12 or 18 September 1868.
