= Troopergate =

Troopergate may refer to:

- Alaska Public Safety Commissioner dismissal, allegations regarding Alaska Governor Sarah Palin, Republican nominee for Vice President of the United States in 2008
- Eliot Spitzer political surveillance controversy, allegations made in 2007 regarding New York Governor Eliot Spitzer
- Troopergate (Bill Clinton), allegations regarding Arkansas Governor Bill Clinton, made in 1993 when he was forty-second President of the United States
