= -ase =

Suffix for enzymes in biochemistry

The suffix -ase is used in biochemistry to form names of enzymes. The most common way to name enzymes is to add this suffix onto the end of the substrate, e.g. an enzyme that breaks down peroxides may be called peroxidase; the enzyme that produces telomeres is called telomerase. Sometimes enzymes are named for the function they perform, rather than substrate, e.g. the enzyme that polymerizes (assembles) DNA into strands is called polymerase; see also reverse transcriptase.

== Etymology ==
The -ase suffix is a libfix derived from "diastase", the first recognized enzyme. Its usage in subsequently discovered enzymes was proposed by Émile Duclaux, with the intention of honoring the first scientists to isolate diastase.

== See also ==
- Amylase
- DNA polymerase
