= Radio promotion =

Division of a record company in charge of placing songs on the radio

Radio promotion is the division of a record company which is charged with placing songs on the radio. They maintain relationships with program directors at radio stations and attempt to persuade them to play singles to promote the sale of recordings, such as CDs, sold by the record company. Those involved are known as record pluggers. They may also pay a fee to a third party, known as an independent promoter, who works in conjunction with the label promoters to further advance the single.

== See also ==
- Payola
- Spin (radio)
