= Glitterati =

Glitterati (derived from 'glitter' and 'literati') may refer to:

- The Glitterati, a British band

- Glitterati (album), an album by that band

- Glitterati (film), a 2004 film directed by Roger Avary
- Fashionable supermodels, celebrities and socialites, an updated version of the Jet set
- An LGBTQ+ rights group involved in glitter bombing politicians
