= Pejorative suffix =

Suffixes forming insults in various languages

A pejorative suffix is a suffix that attaches a negative meaning to the word or word-stem preceding it. There is frequent overlap between this and the diminutive form.

The pejorative suffix may add the sense of "a despicable example of the preceding," as in Spanish -ejo (see below). It can also convey the sense of "a despicable human having the preceding characteristic"; for instance, as in English -el (see below) or the development of the word cuckold from Old French cocu "cuckoo" + -ald, taken into Anglo-Saxon as cokewald and thus to the modern English word.

== Examples ==
=== Catalan ===
The Catalan language has pejorative suffixes.

- -alla -alles Suffixed to nouns gives new nouns. Examples: gentalla (from gent "people"). It is also used as a collective (group) suffix.
- -arro -arros (fem. -arra -arras) Suffixed to nouns gives new nouns. Example: veuarra (from veu "voice"). It is also used as an augmentative suffix.
- -astre -astres (fem. -astra -astres) Suffixed to nouns gives new nouns. Example: poetastra (from poeta "poet"). This suffix has also the meaning "indirect relation with".
- -ot -ots (fem. -ota -otes) Suffixed to nouns gives new nouns. Example: sabatot (from sabata "shoe"). Suffixed to adjectives gives new adjectives. Example: lletjot (from lleig "ugly"). As a suffix it also means "object", giving a lexicalized word.

=== Chinese ===
The Chinese language has pejorative suffixes.

- -屄 (or commonly 逼) bī (profanity), e.g. 二逼 èrbī "dullard" (from 二 èr, which means "dull" in some dialects), 傻逼 shǎbī "fool" (from 傻 shǎ "foolish"), 骚逼 sāobī "bitch" (from 骚 sāo "coquettish")
- -婊 biǎo, e.g. 绿茶婊 lǜchábiǎo (used to describe a lascivious girl who pretends to be innocent, from 绿茶 lǜchá "green tea", which symbolizes innocence)

NOTE: this suffix is from the word 婊子 biǎozi "prostitute", so at first word suffixed with 婊 were used to describe only women, but recently it can be used to describe both men and women, for example, 圣母婊 shèngmǔbiǎo, which means people who pretend to be as merciful as goddesses on the Internet, from 圣母shèngmǔ"goddess"

- -棍 gùn, e.g.淫棍 yíngùn "lewdster" (from 淫 yín "lewd"), 恶棍 ègùn "bad guy", (from 恶 è "evil")
- -鬼 guǐ, e.g. 色鬼 sèguǐ" lewdster"(from 色 sè "lewd"), 醉鬼 zuìguǐ "drunkard" (from 醉 zuì "drunk")
- -货 huò, e.g. 贱货 jiànhuò "contemptible wretch" (from 贱 jiàn "contemptible"), 饿货 èhuò "hungry guy" (from 饿 è "hungry")

=== English ===
- -ard, e.g. coward, dullard, sluggard, drunkard (via Old French)
- -tard, e.g. Paultard, conspiratard, "Trumptard", libtard—a productive libfix abstracted from retard, perhaps influenced by the similar non-productive suffix -ard
- -aster, e.g. poetaster, philosophaster (via Latin)
- -ster, e.g. hipster, oldster (via Old English)
- -nik, e.g. peacenik, neatnik, beatnik (via Yiddish or Russian, where it is not necessarily pejorative)
- -rel, e.g. mongrel, wastrel (from Middle English, from Old French)

=== Esperanto ===
- -aĉ-, e.g. veteraĉo "foul weather" (from vetero "weather"), domaĉo "hovel" (from domo "house"), hundaĉo "cur" (from hundo "dog")

=== Hawaiian ===
- -ā (-wā), e.g. lonoā "gossip" (from lono "news")
- -ea, e.g. poluea "seasickness" (from polu "wet")

=== Italian ===
- -accio(a) (or -uccio/a), e.g. boccaccia "ugly mug" (from bocca "mouth")

=== Japanese ===
- -め (-me), e.g. 「化け物め」 (bakemono-me) "That damn monster!" or 「可愛いやつめ」(kawaii yatsu-me) "That darn cutie!"

=== Latin ===
- -aster, denoting fraudulent resemblance, e.g. patraster "one who plays the father" (from pater "father")

=== Ojibwe (Anishinaabemowin) ===
- -ish, e.g. animosh "dog"

=== Portuguese ===
- -eco, e.g. jornaleco "low-quality newspaper" (from jornal "newspaper")
- -inho, e.g. juizinho "bad judge" (from juiz "judge")

=== Provençal ===
- -asso, e.g. vidasso "wretched life" (from vido "life")

=== Russian ===
- -iška (ишка)
- -uxa (уха), pejorative for non-personal nouns, e.g. černuxa, dramatic term for an unrelentingly bleak cinematic style (from čern- "black")
- -jaga (яга), pejorative for persons, e.g. skuperdjaga (miser or skinflint), skromnjaga (excessively modest person), stiljaga (style-hunter, hipster), dokhodjaga (goner, said of Kolyma labor-camp prisoners nearing death)

=== Spanish ===
- -aco(a), e.g., pajarraco "large ugly bird" (from pájaro "bird), negraco "nigger" (from negro "black"), moraco "raghead" (from moro "Moor").
- -ejo(a), e.g., lugarejo "podunk town" (from lugar "place") and librejo "worthless book" (from libro "book"); however, -ejo can also show endearment, as in festejo.
- -illo(a), e.g., cantantillo "bad (unknown) singer (from cantante "singer"), pistolilla (from pistola "gun"), cancioncilla (from canción "song").
- -on(a), e.g. larguchón "large guy" (from largo "long"), simplon (simpleton), payasón "annoying guy" (from payaso, clown); like the suffix -ejo, can also be used for endearment, as in fiestón, big party.
- -ote(a), e.g., discursote "long dull speech" (from discurso "speech")(used mostly as an augmentative)
- -ucho(a), e.g., casucha "hovel" (from casa "house")
- -zuelo(a), e.g., mujerzuela "whore" (from mujer "woman")
