= Bridezilla =

A bridezilla is a bride whose behavior is seen as demanding or unreasonable. The word comes from bride + -zilla.

- Bridezillas, a reality show which airs on the WE: Women's Entertainment network
- Bridezilla (band), an Australian indie rock band
  - Bridezilla (EP), a 2007 recording by the band Bridezilla
- Bridezilla (film), a 2019 comedy-drama
