= Payola =

Undisclosed paid promotional broadcasts

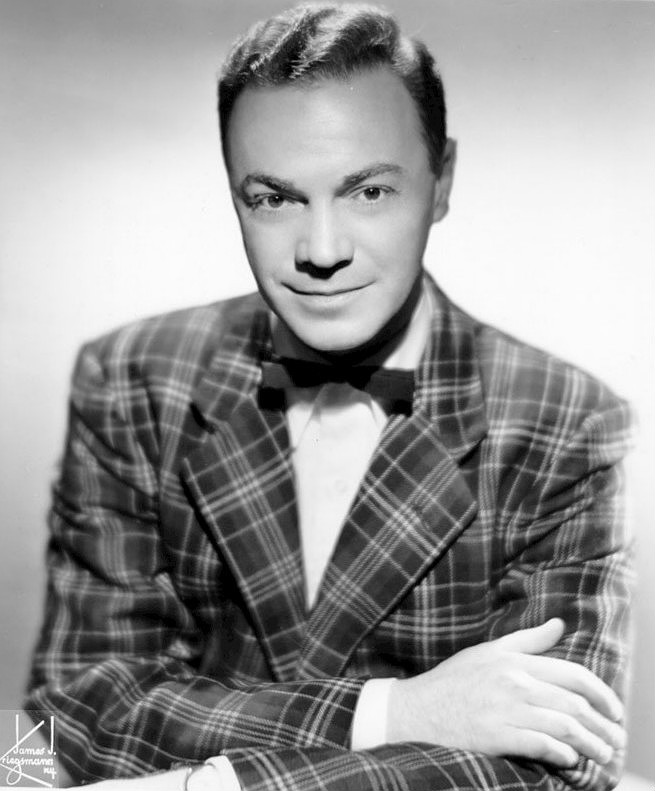
Alan Freed was a notable disc jockey convicted of accepting payola bribes.

Payola, in the music industry, is the illegal practice of paying a commercial radio station to play a song without the station disclosing the payment. Under U.S. law, a radio station must disclose songs they were paid to play on the air as sponsored airtime. The number of times the songs are played can influence the perceived popularity of a song, and payola may be used to influence these metrics. The Federal Communications Commission (FCC) treats payola as a violation of the Sponsorship Identification Rules, which require any broadcast of paid material to include a disclosure.

The term payola, coined by entertainment magazine Variety in 1938, is a combination of "pay" and "-ola," the latter of which is a suffix of product names common in the early 20th century, such as Pianola, Victrola, Amberola, Mazola, Crayola, Rock-Ola, Shinola, or brands such as the radio equipment manufacturer Motorola.

== History ==
Before the 1930s, there was little public scrutiny of the reasoning behind a song's popularity. The advertising agencies that sponsored NBC's radio/TV show Your Hit Parade refused to reveal the specific methods that were used to determine top hits. Only general and vague statements were offered; that determining top hits was based on "readings of radio requests, sheet music sales, dance hall favorites and jukebox tabulations." Early attempts to stop payola were met with silence by publishers.

Prosecution for payola in the 1950s was, in part, a reaction of the traditional music establishment against newcomers. The emergence of hit radio had become a threat to the wages of song pluggers and publishers' revenue streams. Attempts were made to link all payola to then-ascendant rock and roll music, a result of independent record labels and music publishers frequently using payola to promote rock and roll records on American radio.

While the amount of money involved remains largely unpublished, Phil Lind of Chicago station WAIT disclosed in Congressional hearings that he had taken US$22,000 to play a record.

=== U.S. investigations and aftermath ===
The first U.S. Congressional Payola Investigations occurred in 1959. The investigations were carried out by the House Subcommittee on Legislative Oversight into payola, and prompted by a parallel investigation in the US Senate.

DJ Alan Freed, who was uncooperative in committee hearings, was fired as a result. Dick Clark also testified before the committee, but avoided repercussions, partly because he had divested his ownership interest in music-industry holdings.

Following the investigation, radio DJs were stripped of the authority to make programming decisions, and payola became a misdemeanor offense. Programming decisions became the responsibility of station program directors. However, this had the result of simplifying the process of payola: instead of reaching numerous DJs, record labels only had to persuade the station's program director. Labels could circumvent payola allegations by utilizing independent third parties (see below).

In 1976, inner-city urban soul DJ Frankie Crocker was indicted in a payola scandal, causing him to leave New York radio, where his influence was greatest. The charges were later dropped, and he returned to New York, working as a VH-1 VJ.

Following the creation of music-sharing websites in the late 1990s, the power of independent promoters declined, and labels returned to dealing with stations directly.

=== Modern day ===
In recent years, 'payola' has taken on a new form, about the alleged practice of paying streaming services, like Spotify, to recommend an artist more. Payola is also widely used as an insult on Stan Twitter.

== Modus operandi ==
Payola is used by record labels to promote their artists, and can be in the form of monetary rewards or other types of reimbursement. This can include purchasing advertising, requiring bands to play station-sponsored concerts, or paying stations to hold "meet the band" contests. In exchange, the band gains a place on a station's playlist or a lesser-known band of the label may gain airtime.

=== Third-party loophole ===
A perceived loophole in U.S. payola laws is for labels to utilize a third-party or independent promoter (not to be confused with independent record label). The promoter would offer "promotion payments" to station directors for putting their client's artists on the station's playlist, sidestepping Federal Communications Commission (FCC) regulations. As it was seen as falling outside the payola rules, stations did not deem it necessary to report to authorities. This practice became widespread until a 1986 NBC News investigation called "The New Payola" instigated another round of Congressional investigations.

In 2002, investigations by the office of then-New York District Attorney Eliot Spitzer uncovered evidence that executives at Sony BMG Music labels had made deals with several large commercial radio chains. Spitzer's office settled out of court with Sony BMG Music Entertainment in July 2005, Warner Music Group in November 2005 and Universal Music Group in May 2006. The three conglomerates agreed to pay $10 million, $5 million, and $12 million, respectively, to New York State non-profit organizations that will fund music education and appreciation programs. EMI settled in 2006 for $3.75 million.

Concerns about contemporary forms of payola in the US prompted an investigation during which the FCC established that the "loophole" was still a violation of the law. In 2007, four companies (CBS Radio, Citadel, Clear Channel, and Entercom) settled on paying $12.5 million in fines and accepting tougher restrictions for three years, although no company admitted any wrongdoing. Due to increased legal scrutiny, some larger radio companies (including industry giant Clear Channel) now refuse to have any contact with independent promoters.

Clear Channel Radio, through iHeartRadio, launched a program called On the Verge that required the stations to play a given song at least 150 times to give a new artist exposure. Brand managers at the top of the Clear Channel chain, after listening to hundreds of songs and filtering them down to about five or six favorites from various formats, send those selections to program directors across the country. These program directors vote on which ones they think radio listeners will like the most. Songs that benefited from the exposure were Iggy Azalea's "Fancy", Tinashe's "2 On", Anthony Lewis' "Candy Rain", and Jhené Aiko's "The Worst". Tom Poleman, president of national programming platforms for the company, stated that the acts selected are based solely on the quality of their music and not on label pressure.

On Spotify, labels can pay for tracks to appear in user playlists as "Sponsored Songs". It is possible for users to opt out of this in their account settings.

=== As money laundering scheme ===
In Mexico, South America, and some regions along the U.S. southern border, payola is used to launder money from illegal operations. In this practice, unknown "new artists" will suddenly appear on multiple formats and be aggressively promoted by producers of dubious origin, then disappear from the music scene or change their stage name.

== Criticism ==
On 25 September 2007, the U.S. Congress held a hearing on hip-hop music entitled From Imus to Industry: The Business of Stereotypes and Degrading Images. In her testimony, Lisa Fager Bediako, co-founder and President of media watchdog group Industry Ears, argued that misogynistic and racist stereotypes permeate hip-hop because record labels, radio stations, and music video channels profit from allowing such material to air while censoring other material. In that context, Fager stated:

Payola is no longer the local DJ receiving a couple dollars for airplay; it is now an organized corporate crime that supports the lack of balanced content and demeaning imagery with no consequences.

=== Satire of payola practices ===
In 1960, Stan Freberg did a parody on the Payola Scandal, by calling it "Old Payola Roll Blues", a two-sided single, where the promoter gets an ordinary teenager, named Clyde Ankle, to record a song, for Obscurity Records, entitled "High School OO OO", and then tries to offer the song to a jazz radio station with phony deals that the disc jockey just won't buy it. It ends with an anti-rock song, saying hello to jazz and swing, and goodbye to amateur nights, including rock and roll.

The Vancouver new wave band the Payola$ chose their moniker during the punk explosion of the late 1970s.

The practice is criticized in the chorus of the Dead Kennedys song "Pull My Strings", a parody of the song "My Sharona" ("My Payola") sung to a crowd of music industry leaders during a music award ceremony.

The practice is satirized in the song "Payola Blues" by Neil Young, from his 1983 album Everybody's Rockin'. It opens by saying "This one's for you, Alan Freed" and then states "Cause the things they're doing today would make a saint out of you", implying that Payola corruption is bigger now (or was bigger in the 1980s) than it was in the 1950s.

Payola is referenced in Billy Joel's song "We Didn't Start the Fire", during the verse dealing with the events of 1960.

Payola was depicted in the film The Harder They Come, released in 1972, where a record producer, not the recording artist, controls the airwaves. The portrayal of its protagonist (Jimmy Cliff) as an aspiring musician who is forced to sign away his rights to make a hit record depicts the role of record producers and radio DJs as a dominance – the musician ends up with no aspirations or living the same lifestyle, as in the case of the film Rockers.

In an installment of Mathnet from PBS's Square One Television, the detectives George Frankly and Pat Tuesday investigated a case of suspected payola by forming a fictitious group called "The Googols" and creating their own song titled "Without Math". Payola was eventually ruled out as a cause of increased sales of particular songs at a company.

== Criticism of U.S. laws ==
The FCC and the Communications Act of 1934 both have strict requirements and rules regarding payola. These demand that:

employees of broadcast stations, program producers, program suppliers, and others who, in exchange for airing material, have accepted or agreed to receive payments, services, or other valuable consideration must disclose this fact. Disclosure of compensation provides broadcasters the information they need to let their audiences know if the material was paid for, and by whom.

Even with these requirements in place, however, record companies have found loopholes within the phrasing of the regulations to continue the practice. These loopholes have created a situation that isolates independent artists from mainstream media. A current example of this is the lengths that artists Macklemore and Ryan Lewis went to get their music heard. Because Lewis and Macklemore belonged to an independent label, they feared that payola laws would interfere with their airtime. So they hired an independent arm of Warner Music Group, the Alternative Distribution Alliance, which assists independent acts to get their music on radio. Zach Quillen, manager of Macklemore and Ryan Lewis, discussed how "they paid the alliance a flat monthly fee to help promote the album."

One side effect of the vagueness of the law and the creation of the loophole is the expansion of the concept at the hands of online music sharing websites. In 2009, the website Jango created a plan to accept promotion fees legally by disclosing that they are paid to play the songs. "For as little as $30, a band can buy 1,000 plays on the music-streaming service, slotted in between established artists. The artists themselves choose what other music they'd like to be played next to."

== In popular culture ==
In the musical Dreamgirls and its 2006 film adaptation, payola is a recurring plot element.

The WKRP in Cincinnati episode "Johnny Comes Back" features a DJ who promotes a certain band's records in exchange for drugs.

== See also ==
- Alan Freed
- Cash for comment scandal
- Claque
- Frankie Crocker
- Plugola
- Radio promotion
- Telling Lies in America
- Tommy Smalls
