= Hydrant =

A hydrant is an outlet from a fluid main often consisting of an upright pipe with a valve attached, from which fluid (e.g. water or fuel) can be tapped.

Depending on the fluid involved, the term may refer to:

- Fire hydrant for firefighting water supply
- Flushing hydrant for cleaning water mains
- Hydrant network systems used to transport aviation fuel from an oil depot to an airport, to fuel aircraft
- Snowmaking hydrants, which use water and air
- Standpipe (street), a type of domestic or neighbourhood hydrant for dispensing water when supply is interrupted or absent
