= Jacques Duclaux =

French biologist and chemist

Jacques Eugène Duclaux (14 May 1877 – 13 July 1978) was a French biologist and chemist.
