= Anselme Payen =

French chemist (1795–1871)

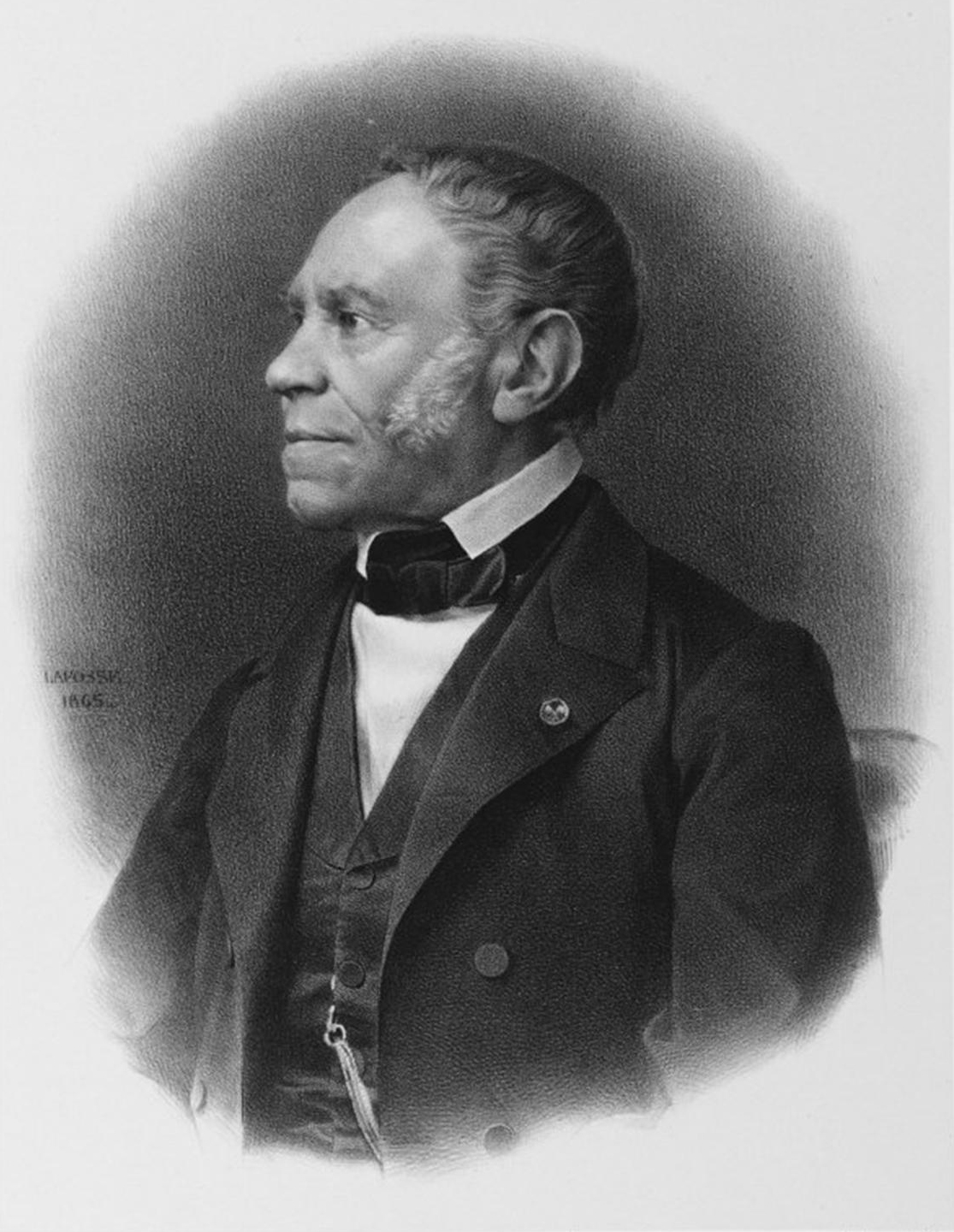
- Born: 6 January 1795; Paris, France
- Died: 12 May 1871 (aged 76); Paris, France
- Known for: Discovered diastase and cellulose
- Scientific career
- Fields: Chemistry
- Workplaces: École Centrale Paris; CNAM

Anselme Payen (French: [pa.jɛ̃]; 6 January 1795 – 12 May 1871) was a French chemist known for discovering the enzyme diastase, and the carbohydrate cellulose.

== Biography ==
Payen was born in Paris, the son of Jean-Baptiste Pierre Payen and Marie-Francoise Jeanson de Courtenay. He began studying science with his father, a graduate of the College de Navarre, when he was a 13-year-old, and later studied Chemistry at the École Polytechnique under the chemists Louis Nicolas Vauquelin and Michel Eugène Chevreul.

At the age of 23, Payen became manager of a borax-refining factory, where he developed a process for synthesizing borax from soda and boric acid. Previously, all borax had been imported from the East Indies exclusively by the Dutch. Payen's new method of synthesizing borax allowed him to sell the mineral at one third the going price, and break the Dutch monopoly.

Payen also developed processes for refining sugar, along with a way to refine starch and alcohol from potatoes, and a method for determination of nitrogen. Payen invented a decolorimeter, which dealt with the analysis, decolorization, bleaching, and crystallization of sugar.

Payen discovered the first enzyme, diastase, in 1833. He is also known for isolating and naming the carbohydrate cellulose.

In 1835, Payen became a professor at École Centrale Paris. He was later elected professor at the Conservatoire National des Arts et Métiers. He died in Paris on May 13, 1871.

== Legacy ==
The rue Anselme Payen, near the Gare Montparnasse, Paris, is named after him.

The American Chemical Society's Cellulose and Renewable Materials Division has established an annual award in his honor, the Anselme Payen Award.
