= Diastase =

Class of enzymes

A diastase (/ˈdaɪəsteɪz/; from Greek διάστασις, "separation") is any one of a group of enzymes that catalyses the breakdown of starch into maltose. For example, the diastase α-amylase degrades starch to a mixture of the disaccharide maltose; the trisaccharide maltotriose, which contains three α (1-4)-linked glucose residues; and oligosaccharides, known as dextrins, that contain the α (1-6)-linked glucose branches.

Diastase was the first enzyme discovered. It was extracted from malt solution in 1833 by Anselme Payen and Jean-François Persoz, chemists at a French sugar factory. The name "diastase" comes from the Greek word διάστασις (diastasis) (a parting, a separation), because when beer mash is heated, the enzyme causes the starch in the barley seed to transform quickly into soluble sugars and hence the husk to separate from the rest of the seed. Today, "diastase" refers to any α-, β-, or γ-amylase (all of which are hydrolases) that can break down carbohydrates.

The commonly used -ase suffix for naming enzymes was derived from the name diastase.

When used as a pharmaceutical drug, diastase has the ATC code A09AA01 (WHO).

Amylases can also be extracted from other sources including plants, saliva and milk.

== Clinical significance ==
Urine diastase is useful in diagnosing uncertain abdominal cases (especially when pancreatitis is suspected), stones in the common bile duct (choledocholithiasis), jaundice and in ruling out post-operative injury to the pancreas; provided that the diastase level is correlated with clinical features of the patient.

Diastase is also used in conjunction with periodic acid–Schiff stain in histology. For example, glycogen is darkly stained by PAS but can be dissolved by diastase. Fungi, on the other hand, stain darkly with PAS even after treatment by diastase.

== See also ==
- Takadiastase
- Whipple disease
- Amylase
