= Hariulf =

Hariulf or Hariulfus may refer to:

- Hariulfus (Burgundian prince) (fl. 4th century)
- Hariulf or Ariulf of Spoleto (died 602), duke
- Hariulfus or Herulph (died 815), founder of Ellwangen Abbey
- Hariulf of Oudenburg (died 1143), abbot and historian
