= Abbey of St. Peter in Oudenburg =

11th-century abbey in Oudenburg, West Flanders

Coordinates: 51.18534°N 3.007°E

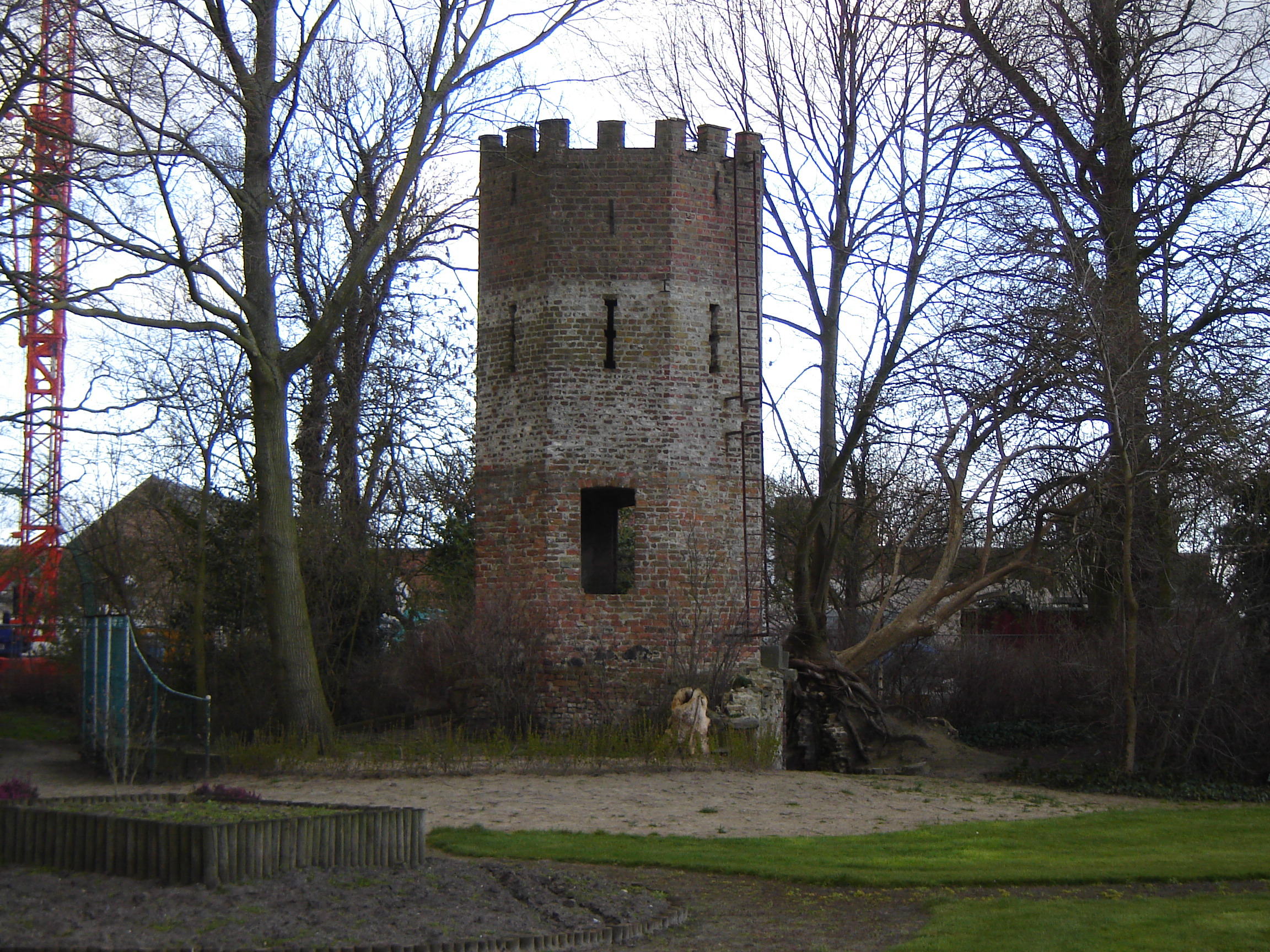
Ruins of the Abbey in Oudenburg.

The Abbey of St. Peter in Oudenburg (French: abbaye Saint-Pierre d'Audembourg) was an abbey established in 1070 by Arnold of Soissons in Oudenburg, West Flanders, which is now located in present-day Belgium.

== History ==
Arnold founded the abbey after he was removed from his position as Bishop of Soissons and at the abbey Arnold began to brew beer to remove pathogens from the water and encouraged the locals to drink it.

In 1173 this abbey started to reclaim salt marshes (flooded land). This resulted in the creation of the Bamberg polder.

In medieval times the pigeons in the town square belonged to the Abbey farm.

The abbey was demolished at the time of the French Revolution. On the 16 February 1797 the abbey and all properties were sold and the buildings were largely demolished. The last monk was Veremundus Norbertus Da (1770–1852) and the property became a farm.

== Site today ==
One tower from the abbey was not destroyed during the Revolution and during Nazi occupation, this tower served as a lookout.

In 1934 Steenbrugge Abbey got the naming rights from St. Peter's Abbey, and in 1989 the farm became a hotel. The town Roman Archeological Museum lies nearby the former abbey and displays some relics of the abbey in its collection.

== Known abbots ==
- Arnold of Soissons. Founder and patron saint of brewers.
- Hariulf (fl. 1130s)
- Raphael de Mercatellis (1463–1478), noted bibliophile.
- Charles Geleyns (c. 1610 – Bruges, 22 August 1677).
