= Kaster =

- Village
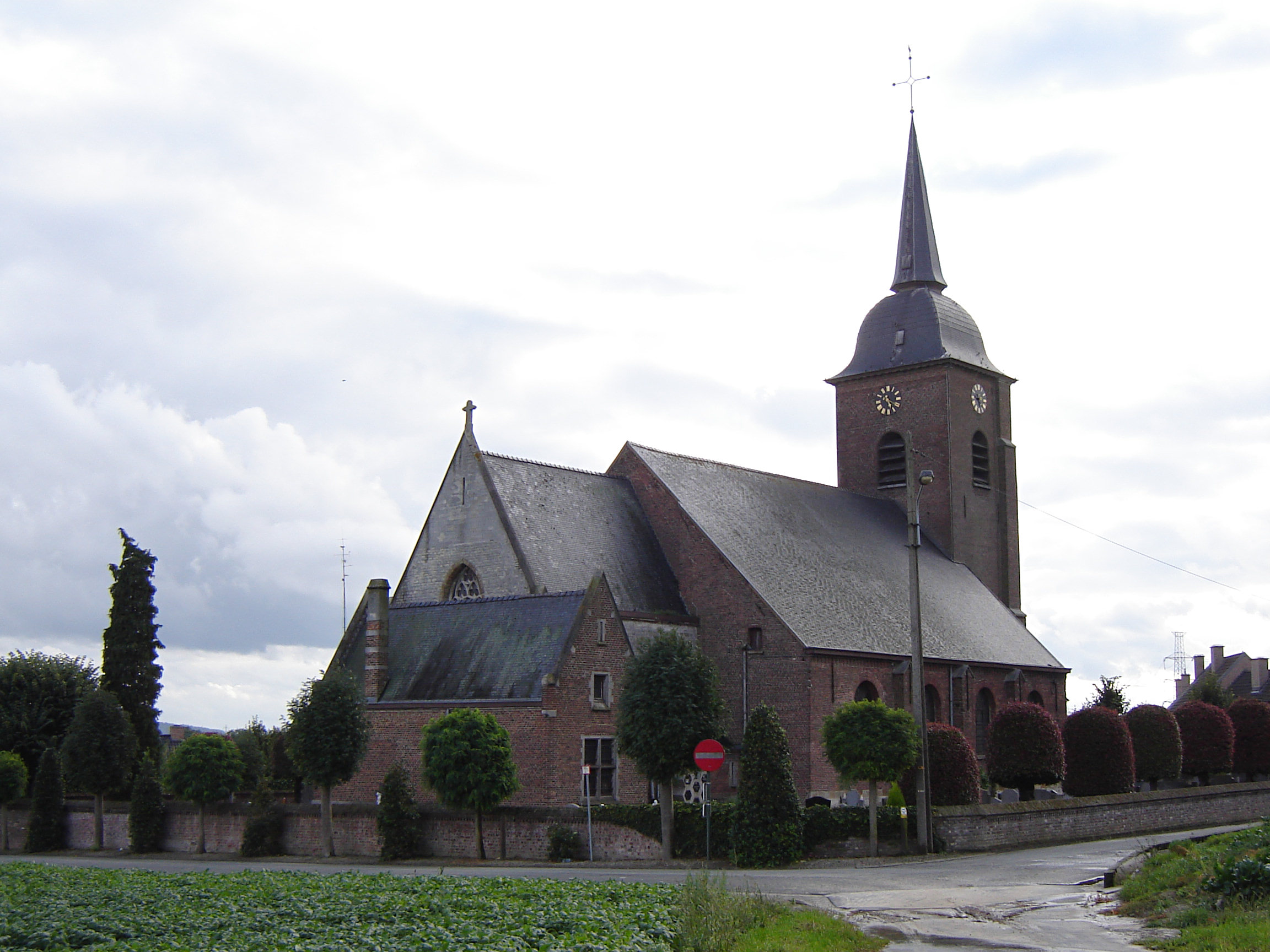
- St Peter's Church of Kaster

- Location within Belgium
- Coordinates: 50°48′47″N 3°29′38″E
- Country: Belgium
- Region: Flemish Region
- Community: Flanders Flemish Community
- Province: West Flanders
- Arrondissement: Kortrijk
- Municipality: Anzegem

Area
  - Total: 4.08 km^{2} (1.58 sq mi)

Population (2004)
  - Total: 803

Kaster (Dutch pronunciation: [ˈkɑstər]) is a village in West Flanders, Belgium. According to the 2005 census it has a population of 803. The neoclassical St Peter's Church of Kaster, located in the eastern part of the village, dates from 1818.

== Geography ==
Kaster is located in the municipality of Anzegem, located just south of this town along the N32 road. To the west is the village of Tiegem, to the south is the village of Kerkhove.

== Politics ==
=== Mayors ===
- 1800–1806 Jean-Baptiste Deman
- 1806–1821 Jan Standaert
- 1821–1827 Petrus Deschietere
- 1827–1836 Martin Teirlinck
- 1836–1852 Franciscus Detollenaere
- 1852–1875 Joannes-Baptista Vandamme
- 1875–1882 Petrus-Franciscus Gerniers
- 1882–1894 Edward Van Cauwenberghe
- 1894–1939 Victor Gerniers
- 1939–1946 Maurice Ardenois
- 1946–1957 Odon Platteau
- 1957–1976 Joël De Stoop
