= Tieghem =

Tieghem may refer to:

- Tiegem (also, Tieghem) is a village in the municipality of Anzegem, near Oudenaarde, West-Flanders,
- Phillippe Édouard Léon van Tieghem, (April 19, 1839 – September 28, 1914), French botanist, with the botanical author abbreviation of Tiegh.
