= Immersion chiller =

Type of chiller used in home brewing

Immersion chillers work by circulating a cooling fluid (usually tap water from a garden hose or faucet) through a copper/stainless steel coil that is placed directly in the hot wort. As the cooling fluid runs through the coil it absorbs and carries away heat until the wort has cooled to the desired temperature. The advantage of using a copper or stainless steel immersion chiller is the lower risk of contamination versus other methods when used in an amateur or homebrewing environment. The clean chiller is placed directly in the still boiling wort and thus sanitized before the cooling process begins.

== See also ==
- Brewing#Wort cooling
- coolship, alternate equipment for cooling
