= Hariulf of Oudenburg =

Hariulf (c. 1160 – 1143) was a Benedictine monk, hagiographer and historian. He was born in Ponthieu and given by his parents to the abbey of Saint-Riquier as a child oblate. In 1105, he was elected abbot of Saint Peter's in Oudenburg,where he served until his death.

During his time at Saint-Riquier, Hariulf wrote a chronicle of the abbey at the request of his fellow monks. The original Chronicon Centulense (also called Gesta ecclesiae Centulensis) cover the years 625–1088. He later extended it down to the end of the abbacy of Gervin II in 1096. He used a wide variety of written and oral sources. His work preserves information lost with the destruction of Saint-Riquier's archives in 1131. An English translation was published in 2024.

The Chronicon was known to William of Malmesbury. It was translated into Old French and continued down to 1437 by an anonymous monk of Saint-Riquier, but this version has been lost. Hariulf's autograph manuscript was lost to fire in 1719, but was copied by André Duchesne.

At Oudenburg, Hariulf wrote a biography of Bishop Arnold of Soissons in support of his canonization.
