= Wort =

Liquid extracted from the mashing process during the brewing of beer or whisky

Wort (/ˈwɜːrt/) is the liquid extracted from the mashing process during the brewing of beer or whisky. Wort contains sugars, the most important being maltose and maltotriose, that will be fermented by the brewing yeast to produce alcohol. Wort also contains crucial amino acids to provide nitrogen to the yeast as well as more complex proteins contributing to beer head (froth) retention and flavour.

== Production ==
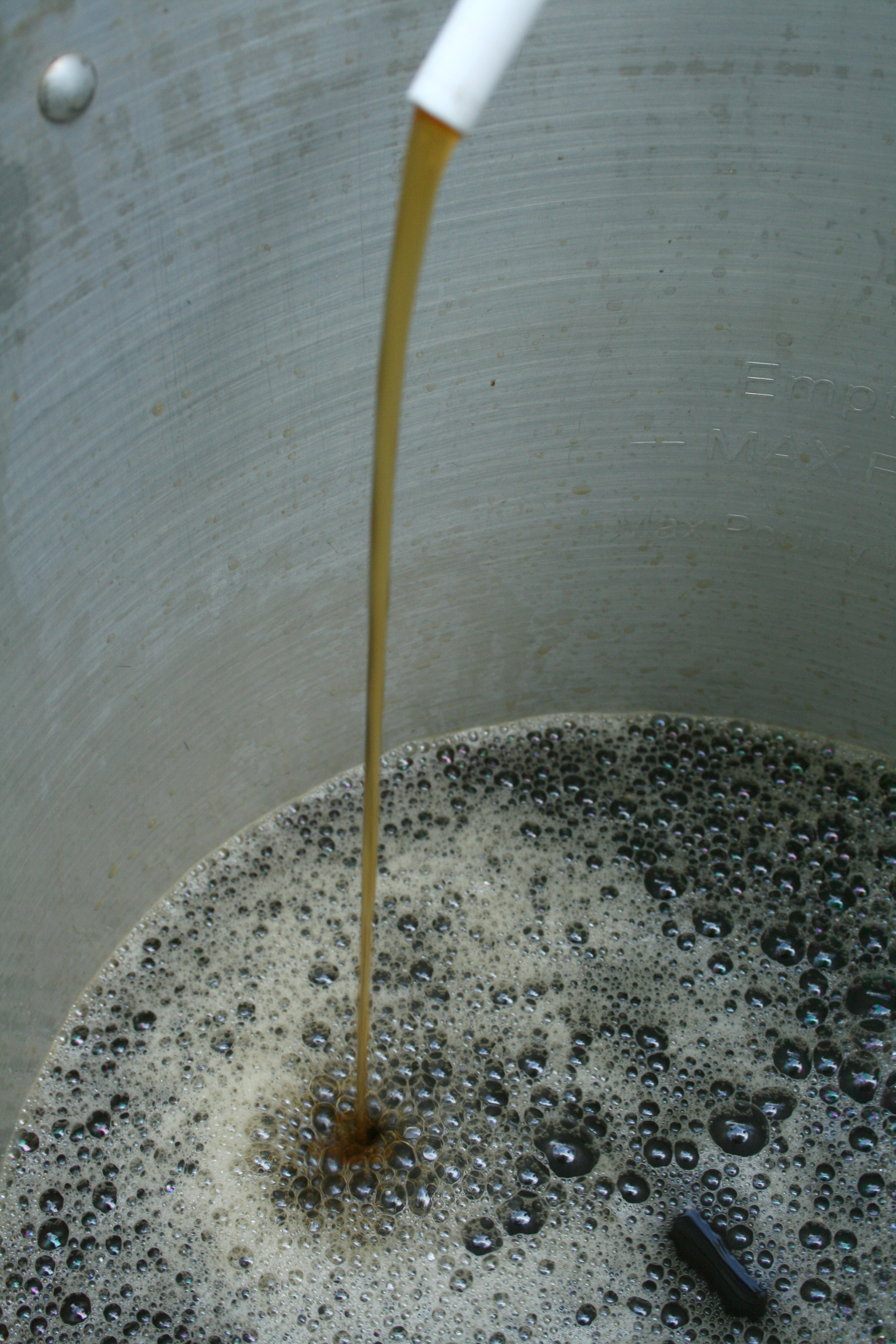
Draining wort

The first step in wort production is to obtain malt, which is made from dried, sprouted cereal grains, including barley. The malt is run through a mill, cracking the husk and exposing the starch inside. The milled grain is then mashed by mixing it with hot water, and then steeped, a process that enables enzymes to convert the starch in the malt into sugars which dissolve in the water. Sometimes the mash is heated at set intervals to alter the enzyme activity. The temperature of the mixture is usually increased to 78 °C (172 °F) for mashout. Lautering is the next step, which means the sugar-extracted grist or solids remaining in the mash are separated from the liquid wort. In homebrewing, the use of grain malt (including milling and mashing) can be skipped by adding malt extract to water to make wort.

The mixture is then boiled to sanitize the wort and, in the case of most beer production, to extract the bittering, flavour and aroma from hops. In beer making, the wort is known as "sweet wort" until the hops have been added, after which it is called "hopped or bitter wort". The addition of hops is generally done in three parts at set times. The bittering hops, added first, are boiled in the wort for approximately one hour to one and a half hours. This long boil extracts resins, which provide the bittering. Then, the flavouring hops are added, typically 15 minutes from the end of the boil. The finishing hops are added last, toward the end of or after the boil. This extracts the oils, which provide flavour and aroma but evaporate quickly. In general, hops provide the most flavouring when boiled for approximately 15 minutes, and the most aroma when not boiled at all.

At the end of boiling, the hot wort is quickly cooled (in homebrewing, often using an immersion chiller) to a temperature favorable to the yeast. Once sufficiently cooled, the wort is transferred to a separate fermentation vessel, oxygenated, and then yeast is added, or "pitched", to begin the fermentation process.

The adjunct grains that can be added to the mash include oats, wheat, corn (maize), rye, and rice. Adjunct grains may first need gelatinization and cooking. They are used to create varietal beers such as wheat beer and oatmeal stout, to create grain whisky, or to lighten the body (and cut costs) as in commercial, mass-produced pale lagers.
