= Mash rake =

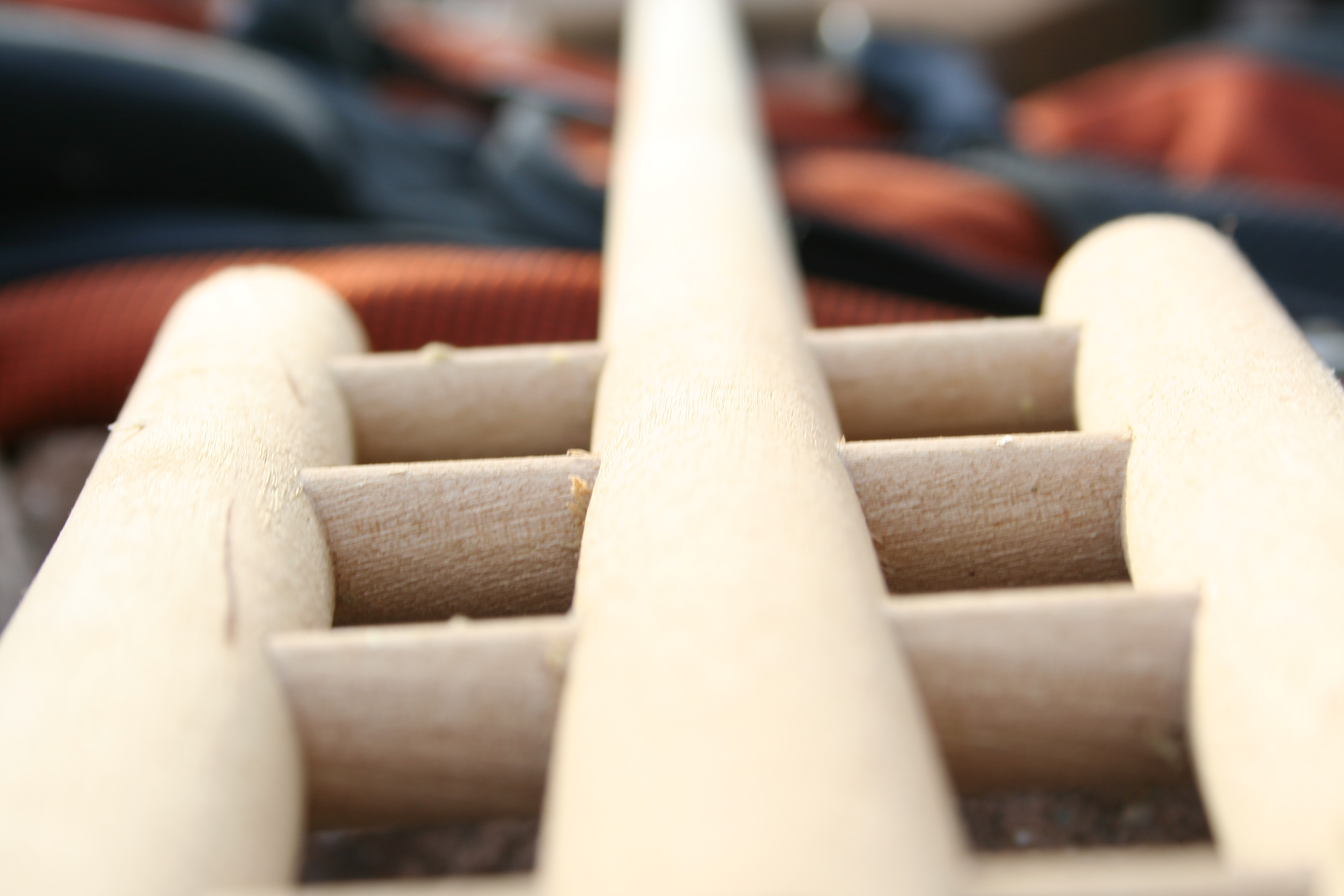
A closeup of the head of a traditional wooden mashing fork.

A mashing fork, mash rake or mashing rake is a tool traditionally used in the mashing process of brewing and distilling. The mashing fork is used to mix the mash by hand to ensure the various grains are properly homogenized and wet everywhere, so no starches are wasted. In modern parlance, the term 'rake' is used most commonly to refer to mechanical knives used to cut the mash bed to optimize the efficiency of the runoff and 'fork' is most commonly used to refer to the traditional, mostly archaic, tool.

== Background ==
Before the industrial age, the mash fork was an instrument made of wood with a long handle, somewhat resembling an oar with large holes in the blade. This type of mash rake (often called a mash paddle) is still used by homebrewers. Large modern brewers, however, use mechanical apparatus to mix the mash instead of manual labour.

== As a symbol ==
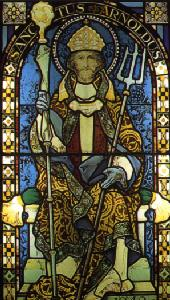
St. Arnold of Soissons, the patron saint of Belgian brewers, is often depicted with a mash rake.

The traditional mash rake is often used as a symbol of brewers, in much the same way that the scythe is used as a symbol of agriculture or the harvest. Saint Arnold of Soissons, the patron saint of Belgian brewers, is often depicted with a mash rake. Many breweries or master-brewers, including Hoegaarden Brewery, incorporate the mash rake into their logo.

== Gallery ==
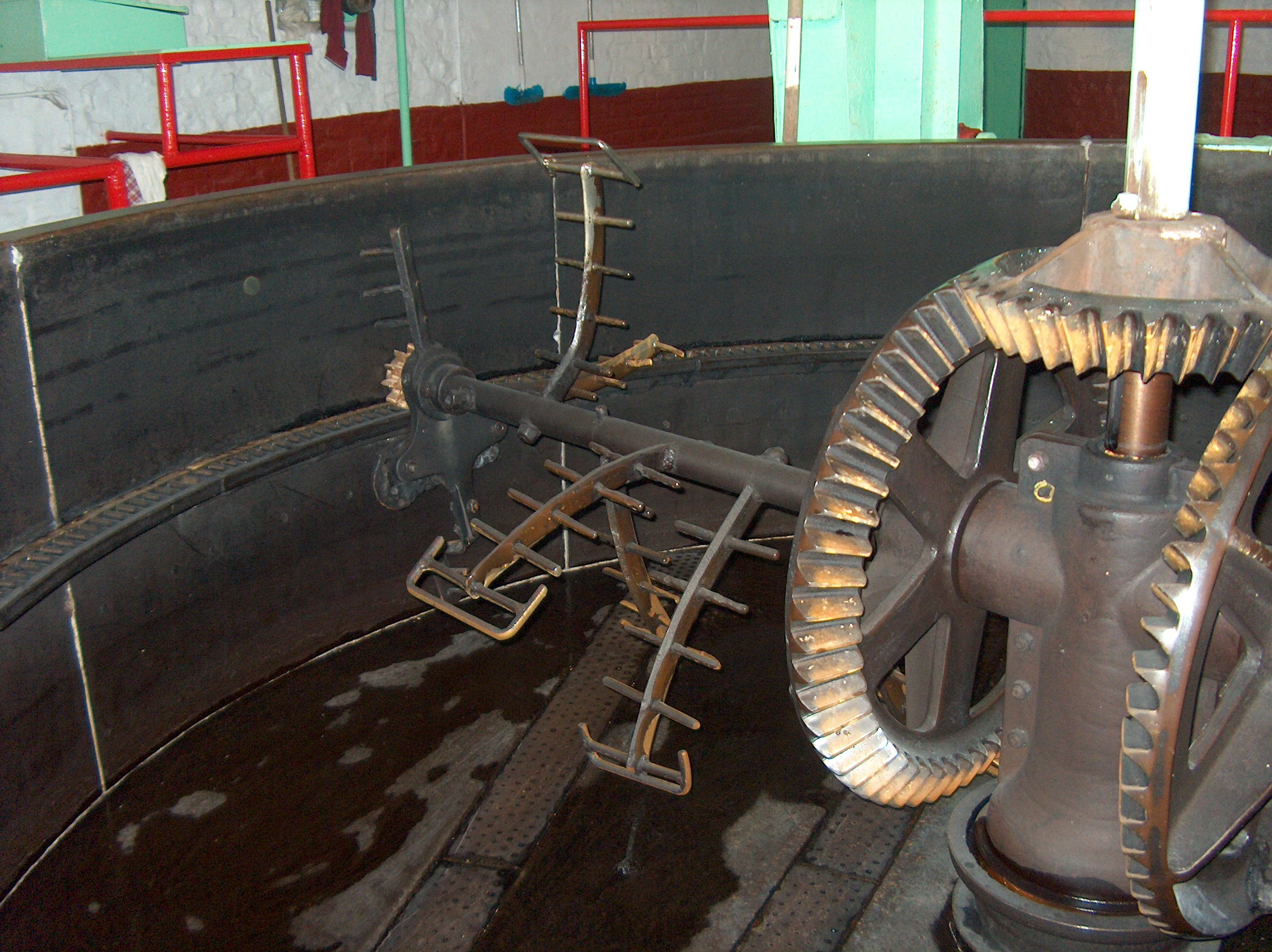
An empty mash tun showing the integrated power-rake.

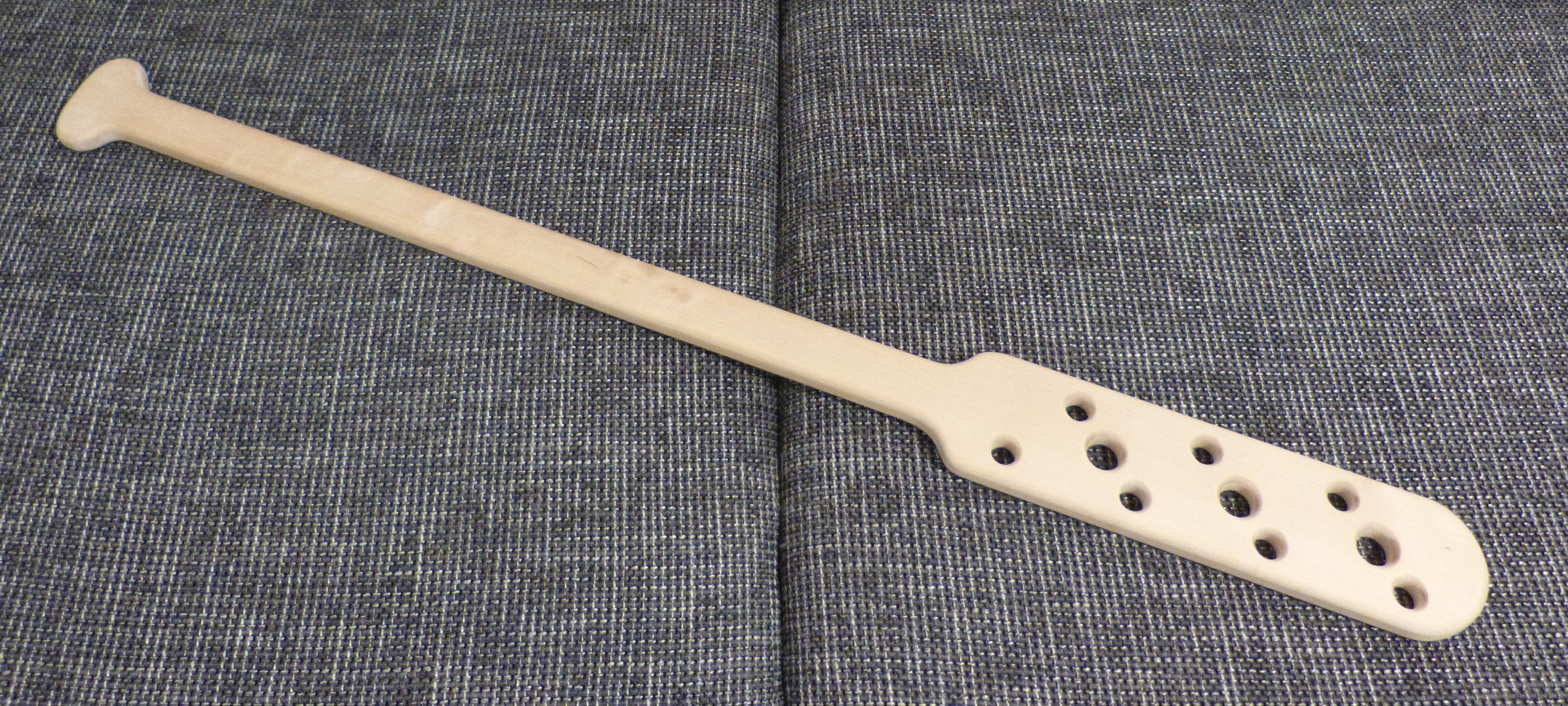
Homemade mash paddle in birch wood.
