= Mashing =

Combining a mix of grains with water and heating the mixture

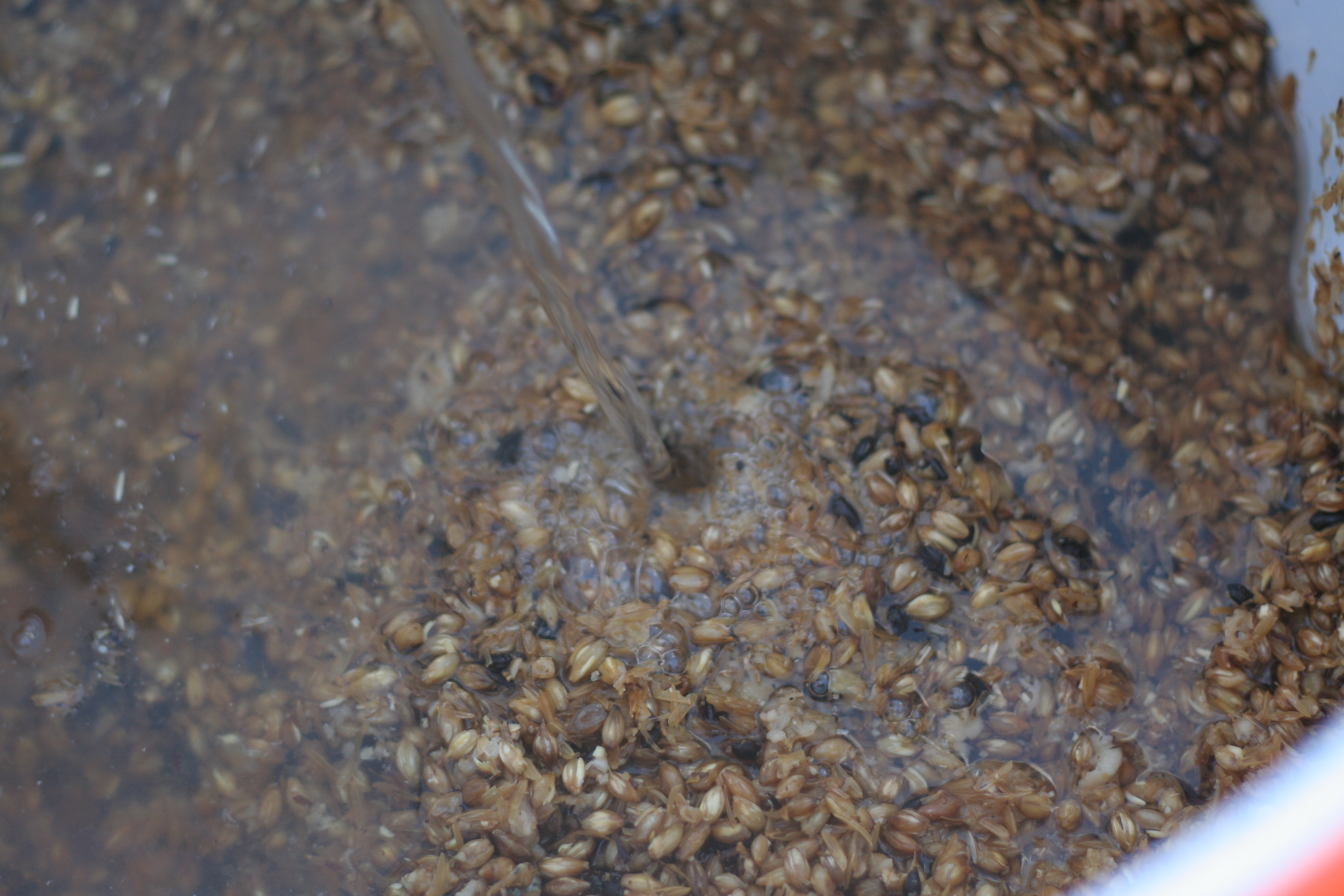
A close-up view of grains steeping in warm water during the mashing stage of brewing

In brewing and distilling, mashing is the process of combining ground grain – malted barley and sometimes supplementary grains such as corn, sorghum, rye, or wheat (known as the "grain bill") – with water and then heating the mixture. Mashing allows the enzymes in the malt (primarily, α-amylase and β-amylase) to break down the starch in the grain into sugars, typically maltose to create a malty liquid called wort.

The two main methods of mashing are infusion mashing, in which the grains are heated in one vessel, and decoction mashing, in which a proportion of the grains are boiled and then returned to the mash, raising the temperature.

Mashing is either done at a single temperature or may involve pauses at certain temperatures (ranging from 45–78 °C or 113–172 °F) and takes place in a "mash tun".

== Etymology ==
The term "mashing" probably originates from the Old English noun masc, which means "soft mixture", and the Old English verb mæscan, which means "to mix with hot water". Usage of the term to refer to "anything reduced to a soft, pulpy consistency" is recorded as early as the late 16th century. The end product is called a "mash".

== Infusion mashing ==
Most breweries use infusion mashing, in which the mash is heated directly to go from rest temperature to rest temperature. Some infusion mashes achieve temperature changes by adding hot water, and some breweries do single-step infusions, performing only one rest before lautering.

== Decoction mashing ==
Decoction mashing involves boiling a portion of the grains and then returning them to the mash, raising the temperature. The boiling extracts more starches from the grains by breaking down the cell walls. It can be classified into one-, two-, and three-step decoctions, depending on how many times part of the mash is drawn off to be boiled. Decoction is a traditional method and is common in German and Central European breweries. It was used out of necessity before the invention of thermometers allowed for simpler step mashing, but the practice is still in use for many traditional beers because of the unique malty flavor it lends to the end product. Boiling part of the grain results in Maillard reactions, which create melanoidins that create rich, malty flavors.

== Mash tun ==
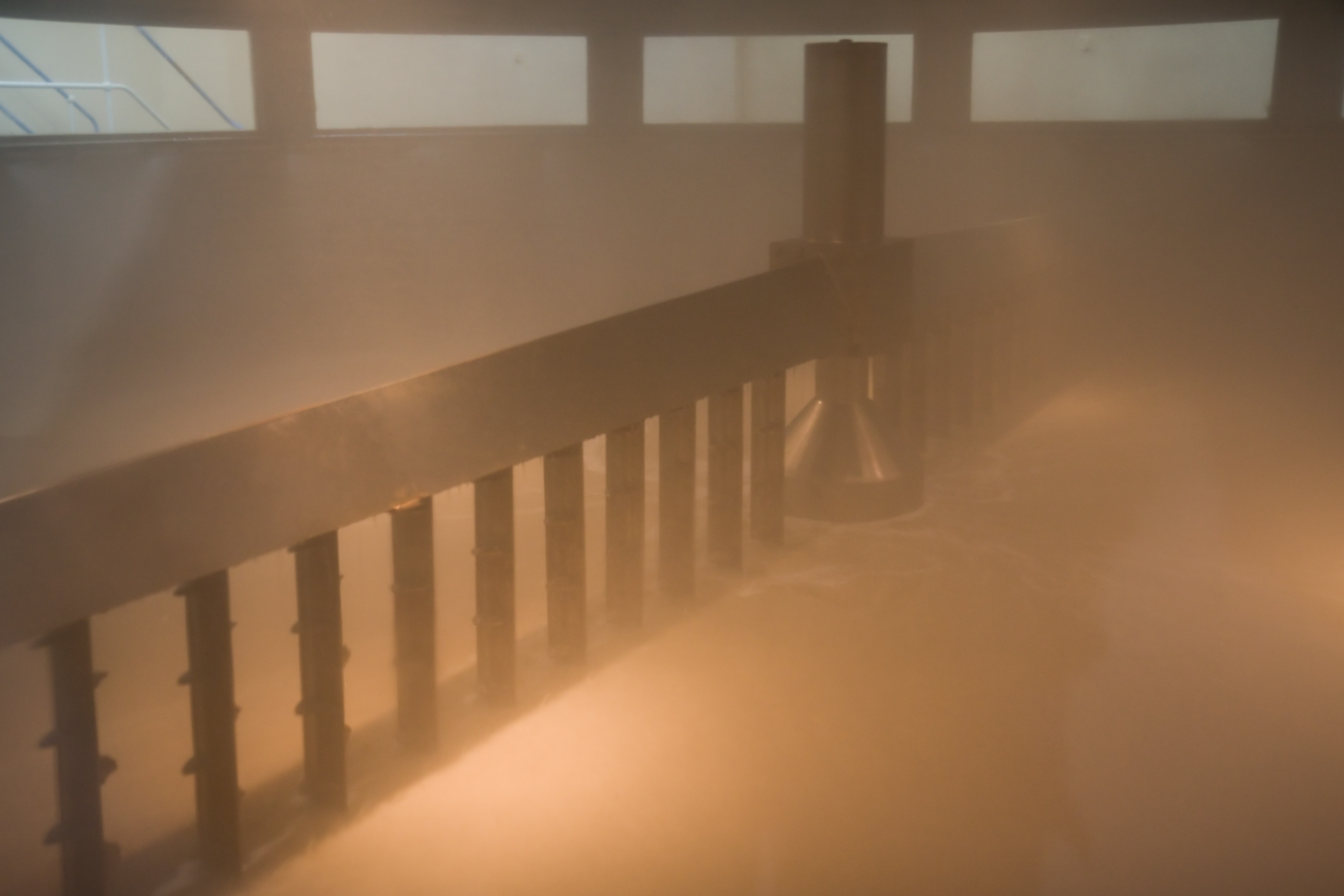
Interior view of a mash tun in a Scotch whisky distillery, showing the stirring mechanism

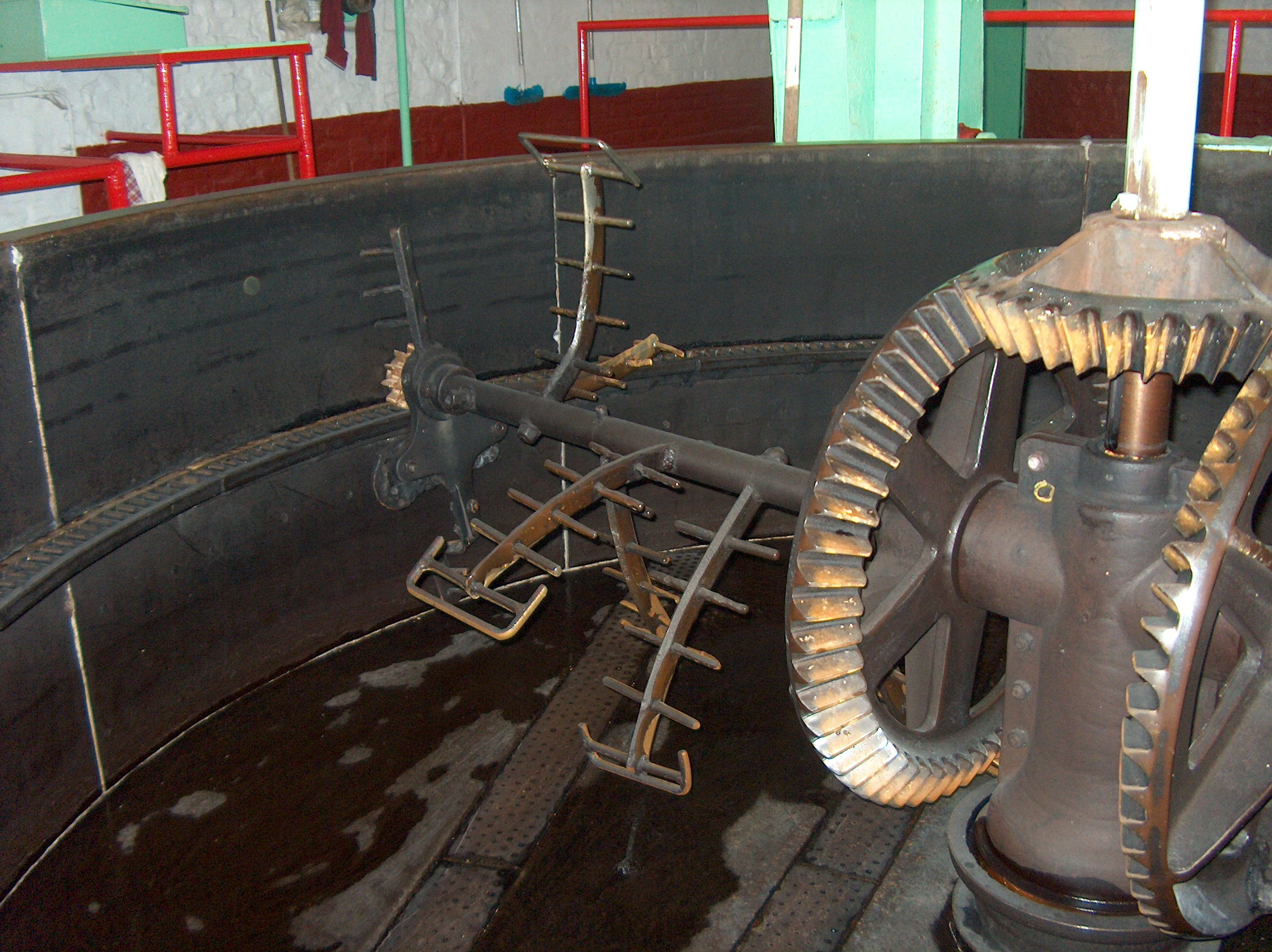
An empty mash tun showing the integrated mash rake

To achieve economies of scale, large breweries often possess at least one dedicated vessel for mashing, called a mash tun. Breweries implementing a decoction process must possess at least two dedicated vessels.

Mash tuns have a powerful stirring mechanism, known as a mash rake, to keep the temperature of the mash uniform. They also have an efficient heating method, often based on steam, that will not scorch the malt. This heating method is combined with proper insulation enabling mash to maintain rest temperatures for up to one hour inside the vessels. A spray ball for clean-in-place (CIP) operation helps with periodic deep cleaning. Sanitation is not a major concern before wort boiling, so a rinse-down is usually all that is necessary between batches.

Smaller breweries often use a boil kettle or a lauter tun for mashing. Using a lauter tun limits the breweries to single-step infusion mashing, however, because such a vessel is not completely appropriate for the lautering process.

== Mashing-in ==
Mixing of the strike water used for mashing in and milled grist must be done in a way that minimizes clumping and oxygen uptake. This was traditionally done by first adding water to the mash vessel and then introducing the grist from the top of the vessel in a thin stream, but this led to a lot of oxygen absorption and loss of flour dust to the surrounding air. A premasher, which mixes the grist with mash-in temperature water while it's still in the delivery tube, reduces oxygen uptake and prevents dust from being lost.

Mashing in – sometimes called "doughing-in" – is typically done between 35–45 °C (95–113 °F), but for single-step infusion mashes, mashing in must be done between 62–67 °C (144–153 °F) for amylases to break down the grain's starch into sugars. The weight-to-weight ratio of strike water and grain varies from one-half for dark beers in single-step infusions to one-quarter or even one-fifth ratios that are more suitable for light-colored beers and decoction mashing, where much of the mash water is boiled off.

== Enzymatic rests ==
Optimal rest temperatures for major mashing enzymes
| Temp °C | Temp °F | Enzyme | Breaks down |
|---|---|---|---|
| 40–45 °C | 104.0–113.0 °F | β-Glucanase | β-Glucan |
| 50–54 °C | 122.0–129.2 °F | Protease | Protein |
| 62–67 °C | 143.6–152.6 °F | β-Amylase | Starch |
| 71–72 °C | 159.8–161.6 °F | α-Amylase | Starch |

In step infusion and decoction mashing, the mash is heated to different temperatures to allow specific enzymes to work optimally. The table at right shows the optimal temperature ranges for key enzymes and what materials those enzymes break down. There is some contention in the brewing industry as to the optimal temperatures for these enzymes, as it is often very dependent on the pH of the mash and its thickness. A thicker mash acts as a buffer for the enzymes. Once a step is complete, the enzymes active in that step are denatured by the increasing heat and become permanently inactive. The time spent transitioning between rests is preferably as short as possible; however, if the temperature is raised more than 1 °C per minute, enzymes may be prematurely denatured in the transition layer near the heating elements.

=== β-Glucanase rest ===
β-glucan is a general term for polysaccharides, such as cellulose, made up of chains of glucose molecules connected by beta glycosidic bonds, as opposed to the alpha glycosidic bonds in starch. They are a major constituent of the cell walls of plants and make up a large part of the bran in grains. A β-glucanase rest done at 40 °C (104 °F) is practiced in order to break down cell walls and make starches more available, thus raising the extraction efficiency. Should the brewer let this rest go on too long, it's possible that a large amount of β-glucan will dissolve into the mash, which could lead to a stuck mash on brew day and cause filtration problems later in beer production.

=== Protease rest ===
Protein degradation via a proteolytic rest plays many roles: production of free-amino nitrogen (FAN) for yeast nutrition, freeing of small proteins from larger proteins for foam stability in the finished product, and reduction of haze-causing proteins for easier filtration and increased beer clarity. In all-malt beers, the malt already provides enough protein for good head retention, and the brewer needs to ensure the amount of FAN produced can be metabolized by the yeast to avoid off flavors. The haze causing proteins are also more prevalent in all-malt beers, and the brewer must strike a balance between breaking down these proteins and limiting FAN production.

=== Amylase rests ===
The amylase rests are responsible for the production of free fermentable and non-fermentable sugar from starch in a mash. Starch is an enormous molecule made up of branching chains of glucose molecules.

β-amylase breaks down these chains from the end molecules, forming links of two glucose molecules, i.e. maltose. β-amylase cannot break down the branch points, although some help is found here through low α-amylase activity and enzymes such as limit dextrinase. The maltose will be the yeast's main food source during fermentation. During this rest, starches also cluster together forming visible bodies in the mash. This clustering eases the lautering process.

The α-amylase rest is also known as the saccharification rest. During this rest, the α-amylase breaks down the starches from the inside and starts cutting off links of glucose that are one to four glucose molecules in length. The longer glucose chains, sometimes called dextrins or maltodextrins, along with the remaining branched chains give body and fullness to the beer.

Because of the closeness in temperatures of peak activity of an α-amylase (63-70 °C) and β-amylase (55-65 °C), the two rests are often performed at once with the time and temperature of the rest determining the ratio of fermentable to non-fermentable sugars in the wort and, hence, the final sweetness of the fermented drink.

A hotter rest results in a fuller-bodied, sweeter beer as α-amylase produces more non-fermentable sugars. 66 °C (151 °F) is a typical rest temperature for a pale ale or German pilsener, while Bohemian pilsener and mild ale are typically rested at 67–68 °C (153–154 °F).

=== Decoction "rests" ===
In decoction mashing, part of the mash is taken out of the mash tun and placed in a cooker, where it is boiled for a period of time. This caramelizes some of the sugars, giving the beer a deeper flavor and color, and frees more starches from the grain, making for a more efficient extraction from the grains. The portion drawn off for decoction is calculated so the next rest temperature is reached by simply putting the boiled portion back into the mash tun. Before drawing off for decoction, the mash is allowed to settle a bit, and the thicker part is typically taken out for decoction, as the enzymes have dissolved in the liquid, and the starches to be freed are in the grains, not the liquid. This thick mash is then boiled for around 15 minutes and returned to the mash tun.

The mash cooker used in decoction should not scorch the mash, but maintaining a uniform temperature in the mash is not a priority. To prevent a scorching of the grains, the brewer must continuously stir the decoction and apply slow heating. A decoction mash brings out a higher malt profile from the grains and is typically used in Bock or Doppelbock beers.

== Mash-out ==
After the enzyme rests, the mash is raised to its mash-out temperature. This frees up about 2% more starch and makes the mash less viscous, allowing the lauter to process faster. Although mash temperature and viscosity are roughly inversely proportional, the ability of brewers and distillers to use this relationship is constrained by the fact that α-Amylase quickly denatures above 78 °C (172.4 °F). Any starches extracted once the mash is brought above this temperature cannot be broken down and will cause a starch haze in the finished product. In larger quantities, an unpleasantly harsh flavor can develop. Therefore, the mash-out temperature rarely exceeds 78 °C (172.4 °F).

If the lauter tun is a separate vessel from the mash tun, the mash is transferred to the lauter tun at this time. If the brewery has a combination mash-lauter tun, the agitator is stopped after mash-out temperature is reached and the mash has mixed enough to ensure a uniform temperature.

== See also ==
- Grain bill
- Wort
- Sour mash
