= Anzegem =

- Municipality
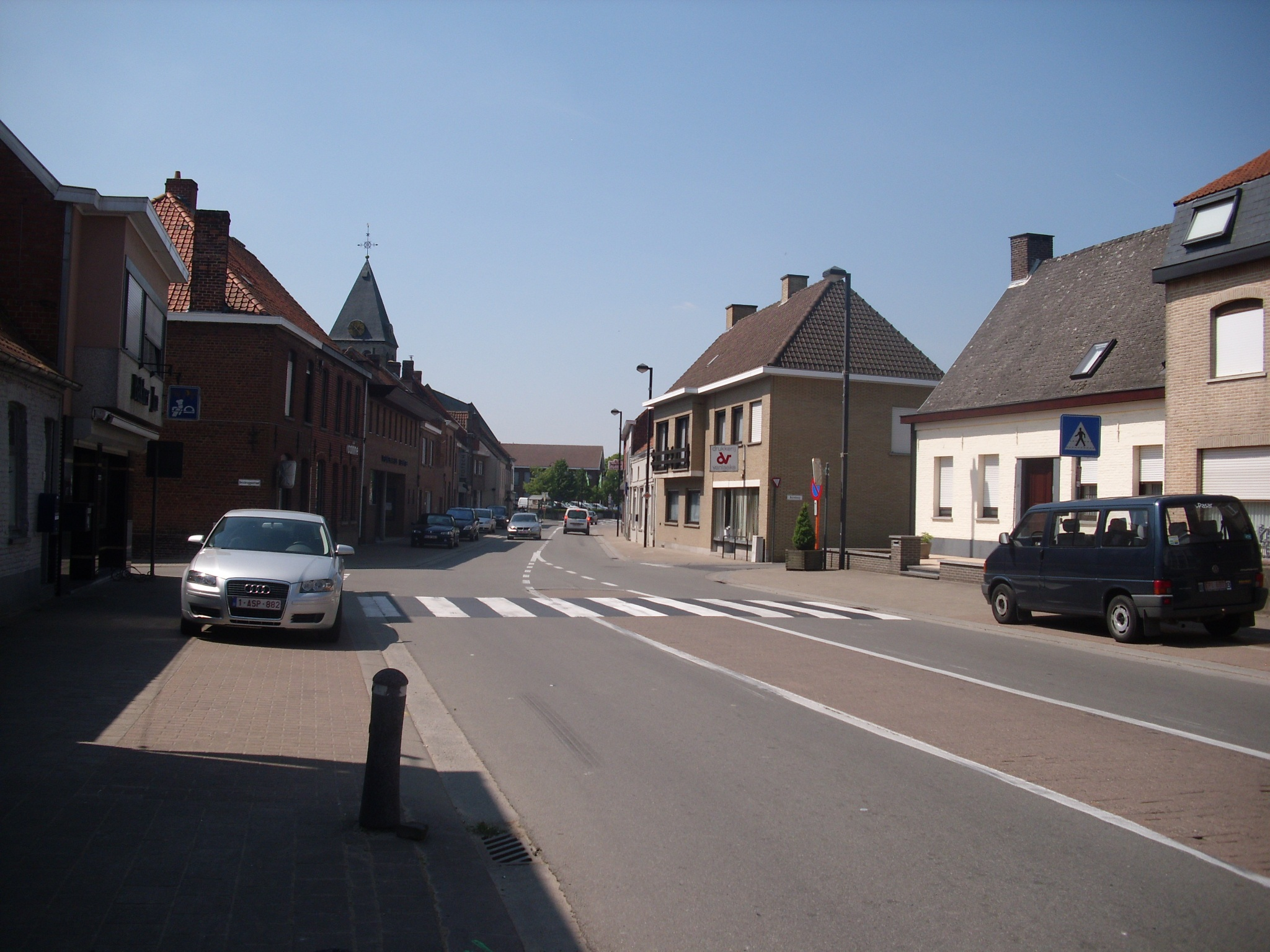

- Flag Coat of arms

- Location of Anzegem in West-Flanders
- Interactive map of Anzegem
- Location in Belgium
- Coordinates: 50°50′N 03°28′E
- Country: Belgium
- Community: Flemish Community
- Region: Flemish Region
- Province: West Flanders
- Arrondissement: Kortrijk

Government
  - Mayor: Pauline Van Marcke (Samen Eén)
  - Governing parties: Samen Eén, Inzet, N-VA

Area
  - Total: 42.35 km^{2} (16.35 sq mi)

Population (2018-01-01)
  - Total: 14,609
  - Density: 345.0/km^{2} (893.4/sq mi)
- Postal codes: 8570, 8572, 8573
- NIS code: 34002
- Area codes: 056
- Website: www.anzegem.be

Anzegem (Dutch pronunciation: [ˈɑnzəɣɛm]) is a municipality located in the Belgian province of West Flanders. The municipality comprises the towns of Anzegem proper, Gijzelbrechtegem, Ingooigem, Kaster, Tiegem and Vichte. On 1 January 2018 Anzegem had a total population of 14,609. The total area is 42.35 km^{2} which gives a population density of 345 inhabitants per km^{2}.

One of the most famous inhabitants of Anzegem was Stijn Streuvels, the Flemish writer who died in Ingooigem in 1969, aged 98.

On the night of 16 October 2014, Anzegem's medieval parish church of Saint John the Baptist (Sint Jan de Doperkerk in Dutch) was destroyed in a fire.

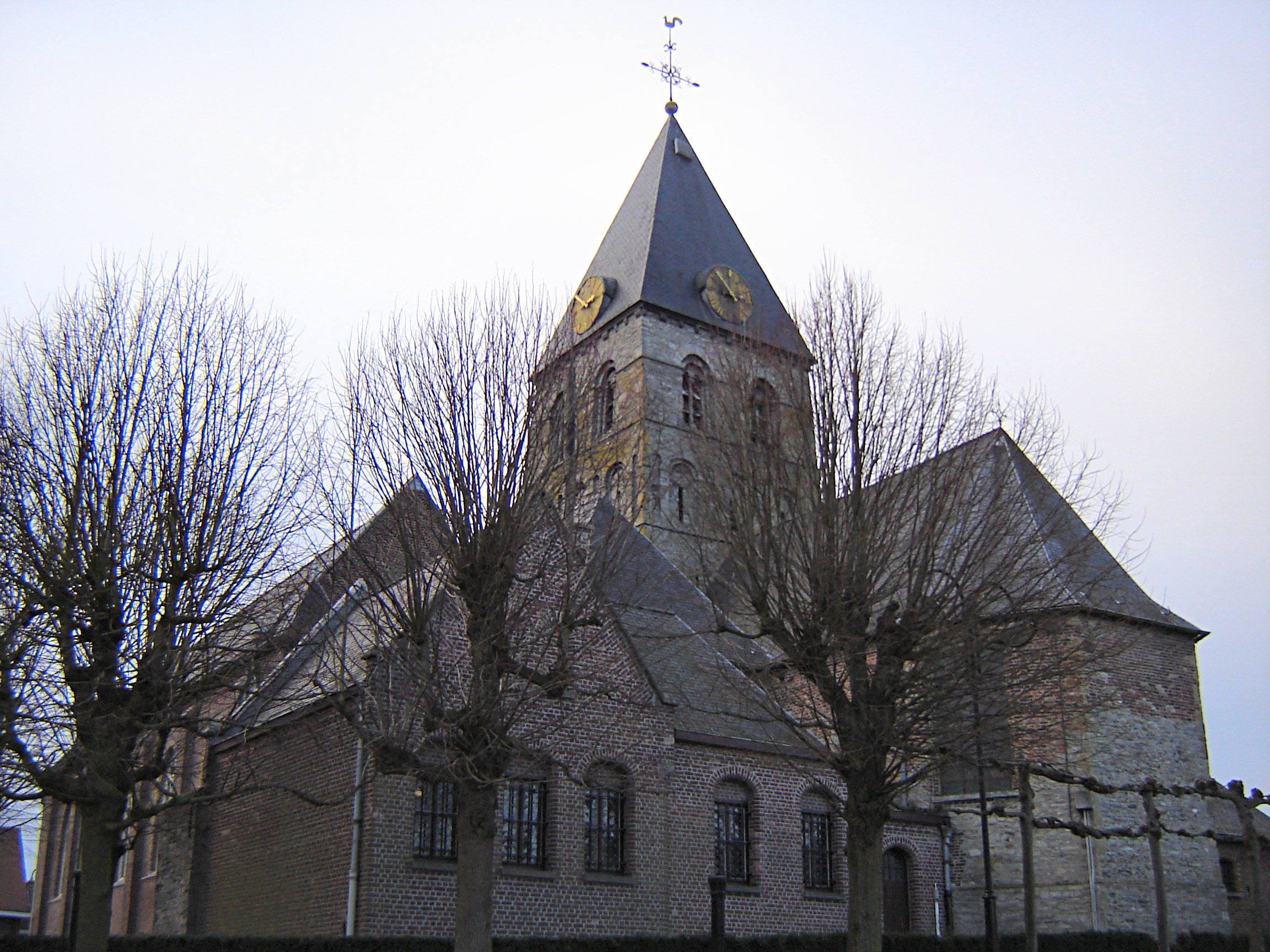
Anzegem's church of Saint John the Baptist before it was destroyed by fire in 2014.
