= Raphael de Mercatellis =

Book collector from Flanders (1437–1508)

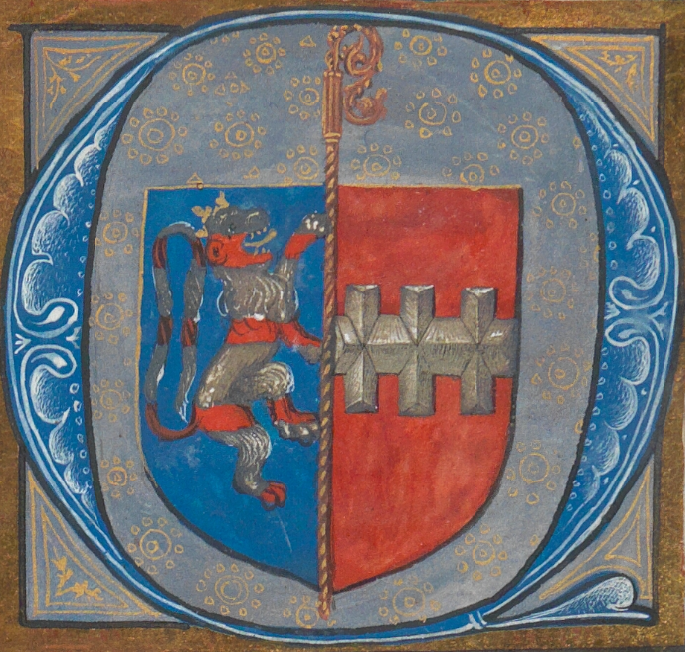
Coat of arms of Raphael de Mercatellis in an inhabited initial in one of his manuscripts

Raphael de Mercatellis, also known as Raphael of Burgundy (1437 – 3 August 1508), was a church official, imperial counsellor and bibliophile. He was the illegitimate son of Duke Philip the Good of Burgundy and a woman of Venetian origins, the wife of a merchant. He was born in Bruges. While pursuing a career within the Catholic church, and particularly after becoming abbot of Saint Bavo's Abbey in Ghent, he assembled a collection of lavish illuminated and decorated manuscripts. The library he created is of historical importance as the earliest library in the Low Countries containing a significant number of Renaissance humanist books. Sixty-five books from his library have been traced to collections worldwide, making it an unusually intact medieval book collection attributable to a single owner.

== Biography ==
Raphael de Mercatellis was the illegitimate son of Duke Philip the Good of Burgundy and a woman from the merchant family Mercatelli. The Mercatelli family was of Venetian origins and had settled in Bruges, where Raphael de Mercatellis was born, for reasons of trade. Raphael's mother was the wife of a merchant named Bernardus. Raphael de Mercatellis was one of a large number of illegitimate children of Duke Philip, and like most of his male half-siblings was provided with an education and a career by the ducal court.

De Mercatellis studied theology in Paris (graduated in 1462) and pursued a career within the church. Already at the age of 27 he was appointed abbot of the Abbey of St. Peter in Oudenburg west of his hometown Bruges. There he became friends with the early humanist Jan Van de Veren or Johannes de Veris. In 1478 de Mercatellis was appointed abbot of the prestigious Saint Bavo's Abbey in Ghent. In 1487 he was made titular bishop of Rhosus and auxiliary bishop of Tournai, and one year later Emperor Maximilian I appointed him as a counsellor. He retired to Bruges in 1507 from his official duties and died the following year. He planned a large funerary monument for himself, and upon his death his body was supposedly transported from Bruges to Ghent by a retinue including 100 horses.

Throughout his professional life, de Mercatellis appears to have paid little attention to his religious duties. He is reported as having neglected paying proper attention to the upkeep of the abbey buildings, and though he amassed a large library it contained very few religious texts, not even a bible or a book of hours, a popular kind of prayer book at the time. It has been suggested that he viewed his postings mainly as a source of income.

== Book collection ==
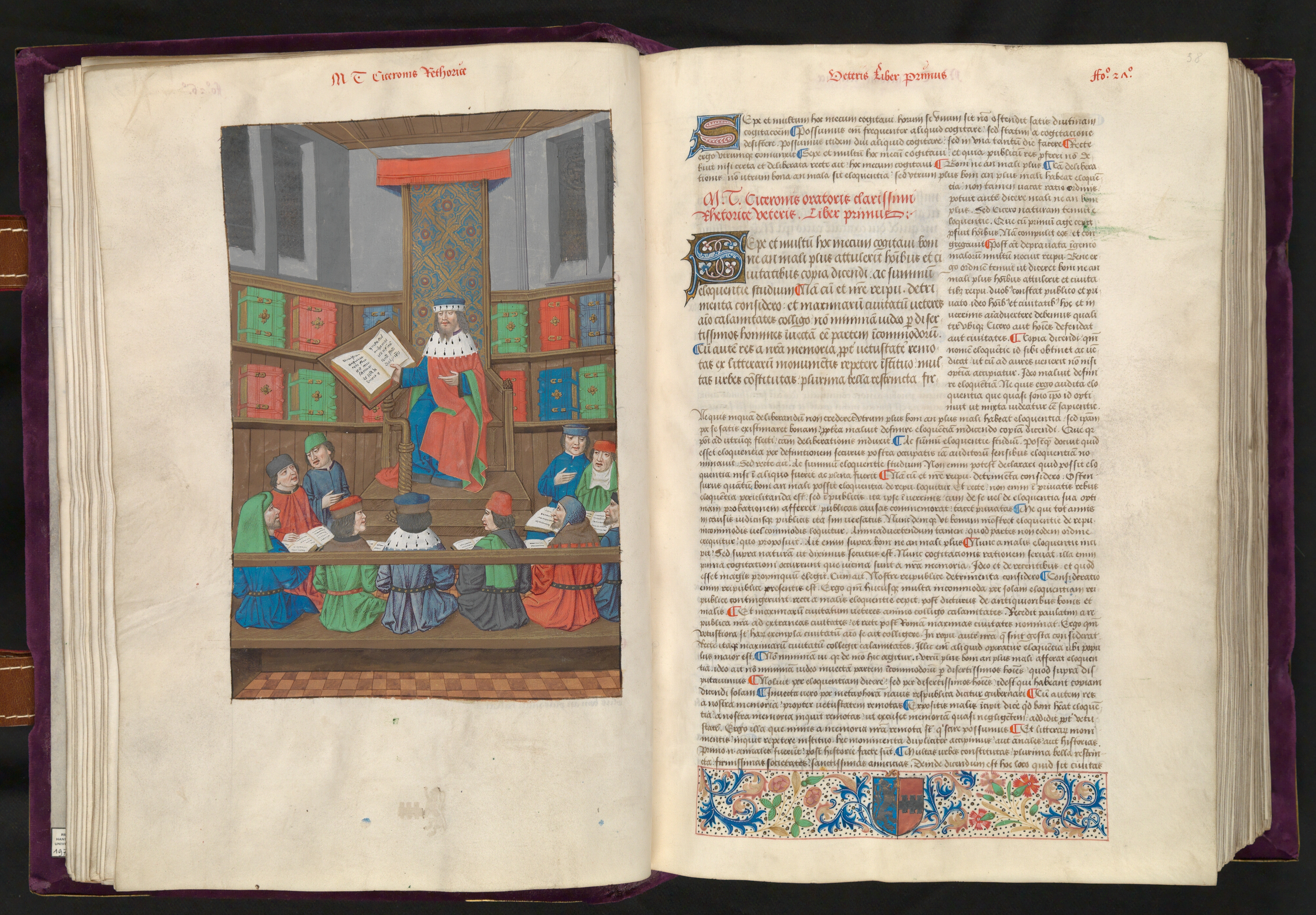
A manuscript (a collection of works by i.a. Cicero and Ermolao Barbaro) from the library of de Mercatellis with a full-page miniature

Raphael de Mercatellis began buying books early in life, after having been appointed abbot of St. Peter's abbey in Oudenburg. When he arrived at the wealthy Saint Bavo's Abbey, he used funds from the abbey to commission more and more costly manuscripts. The books commissioned by de Mercatellis were luxuriously made, written on fine parchment and bound in colourful damask, silk or camlet bindings. They often contain his coat of arms and an unidentified monogram, LYS or SLY. All the manuscripts in his library were commissioned by him, not bought second-hand or ready-made, which is very unusual for a medieval collection. They were made in workshops in Bruges and Ghent. It is possible that de Mercatellis wrote the text of some of the books himself, acting as his own scribe. Commissioning handwritten and decorated books in this way was already becoming old-fashioned during this time, as printed books had started to replace hand-written manuscripts. In fact, miniatures found in several books ordered by de Mercatellis were copies of woodcut prints. Ordering handmade books in this way could have been a way for him to appear distinguished and learned, and could also have been a way to showcase his wealth.

At the same time, the collection has been described by Hendrik Defoort of the Ghent University Library as the "most important humanist library in the Low Countries before the 16th century" and was, according to art historian Alain Arnould, the first library in the Low Countries "to reveal an extensive interest in what we may call Renaissance ideas", giving it a certain historical importance. It contained several books by classical authors as well as by Italian writers, conveying humanist ideas. The aversion towards printed books was shared by another humanist bibliophile at the time, Federico da Montefeltro. In addition, the library of de Mercatellis also contained books on geography, medicine and pseudoscience such as astrology and chiromancy. It is not known exactly how many and which books constituted Raphael de Mercatellis's library, but an inventory from the 16th century lists 80 books. Albert Derolez identified a total of 57 books traceable to the collection of de Mercatellis in 1979; Hendrik Defoort in 2022 listed 65 books spread among several collections in different countries.

After the death of de Mercatellis, some of the books dispersed from the library of St Bavo's Abbey. Some are today found in the city library of Haarlem in the Netherlands, and may have been taken there as loot during the Eighty Years' War. Other books were sold piecemeal by the canons of St Bavo, including a set of 15 manuscripts sold to the Earl of Leicester and today in Holkham Hall, England. While many ecclesiastical collections were seized by the French during the French Revolutionary Wars, remaining manuscripts from the library of de Mercatellis avoided this fate and in 1817 were brought to the library of Ghent University. The university library today owns 22 books originally commissioned by de Mercatellis. It is unusual for a medieval book collection to be attributable to a single original owner and to have survived through history relatively intact in this way. Since 2013, the collection in Ghent of remaining books from the library of de Mercatellis has been formally designated as a "top piece" according to the Masterpieces Decree of the Flemish Community, and thus considered "rare and indispensable for the Flemish Community".

== Works cited ==
- Arnould, Alain (1988). "The Iconographical Sources of a Composite Manuscript from the Library of Raphael de Mercatellis". Journal of the Warburg and Courtauld Institutes. 51: 197–209. doi:10.2307/751276. JSTOR 751276. S2CID 195012366.
- Arnould, Alain (1989). "New Manuscripts Related to Johannes de Veris". Humanistica Lovaniensia. 38: 318–320. JSTOR 23973723.
- van Bergen, Saskia (2011). "Two Identical Manuscripts from the Library of Raphael de Mercatellis? The Relationship between MSS 11 and 17 in the University Library of Ghent". Quaerendo. 41 (1/2): 89–98. doi:10.1163/157006911X570189.
- Vaughan, Richard (2002) [1970]. Philip the Good (2 ed.). Woodbridge: Boydell Press. ISBN 978-0-85115-917-1.
