= Oudenburg =

- City and municipality
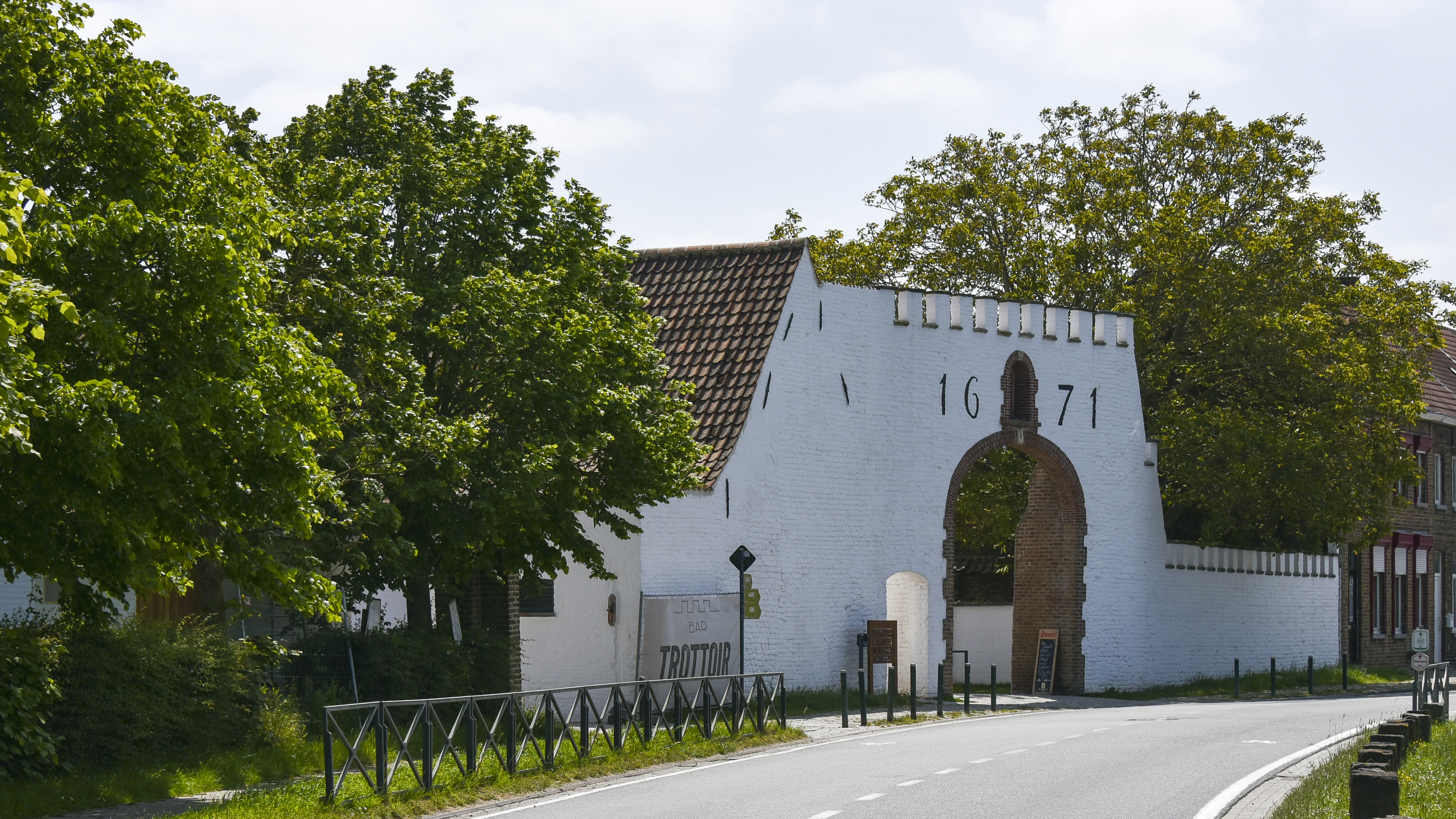
- Gate of the abbey's farm

- Flag Coat of arms

- Location of Oudenburg in West Flanders
- Interactive map of Oudenburg
- Location in Belgium
- Coordinates: 51°11′04″N 03°00′17″E
- Country: Belgium
- Community: Flemish Community
- Region: Flemish Region
- Province: West Flanders
- Arrondissement: Ostend

Government
  - Mayor: Romina Vanhooren (Open Vld)
  - Governing parties: Open Vld, Vooruit, N-VA

Area
  - Total: 35.6 km^{2} (13.7 sq mi)

Population (2022-01-01)
  - Total: 9,717
  - Density: 273/km^{2} (707/sq mi)
- Postal codes: 8460
- NIS code: 35014
- Area codes: 059
- Website: www.oudenburg.be

Oudenburg (Dutch pronunciation: [ˈʌudə(m)ˌbʏr(ə)x]; French: Audembourg [odɑ̃buʁ]; West Flemish: Oednburg [ˈʊdn̩bœrh]; Latin: Aldenburgensis) is a municipality and city located in the Belgian province of West Flanders. The municipality comprises the city of Oudenburg itself and the towns of Ettelgem, Roksem and Westkerke. On January 1, 2006 Oudenburg had a total population of 8,929. The total area is 35.38 km^{2} which gives a population density of 252 inhabitants per km^{2}.

Oudenburg is situated on the location of a Roman castellum built in the 4th century, whose outline is still visible in the city's streetplan. Some of the stones of the former walls were later used in the construction of the abbey. The former abbey of St. Peter at Oudenburg, founded by Arnold of Soissons, was destroyed during the French Revolution.

== History ==
- 1070 AD: Arnold of Soissons founded the Abbey of St. Peter in Oudenburg.
- 1087: Death of Arnold of Soissons. (also known as Arnold of Oudenburg or Saint Arnold.)
- 1226: The City is represented on a Seal.
- 1843, February 2: The arms were granted.

The arms show a castle with the arms of the medieval Lords of Oudenburg in the gate. The castle (Burcht) is a canting element. The castle already appeared on the oldest seal of the city, dating from 1226. All later seals showed a castle, but the size and shape of the castle has changed considerably through the centuries. The small shield appeared for the first time in the 16th century.

In the 19th century, it was rumored that Attilla the Hun was responsible for the destruction of the town, which was claimed to have happened in the 5th century.

== Notable people ==
- Raphael de Mercatellis, church official and imperial counsellor.
- Felipe Diricksen, baroque painter primarily of portraits and religious paintings.
- Charles Geleyns, abbot of the abbey of St. Peter of Oudenburg.
- André Gennevoise, owner of the abbey of St. Peter of Oudenburg.
- Maurits Gysseling, researcher into historical linguistics and paleography.
- John Cordier, founder of Telindus.

== Gallery ==
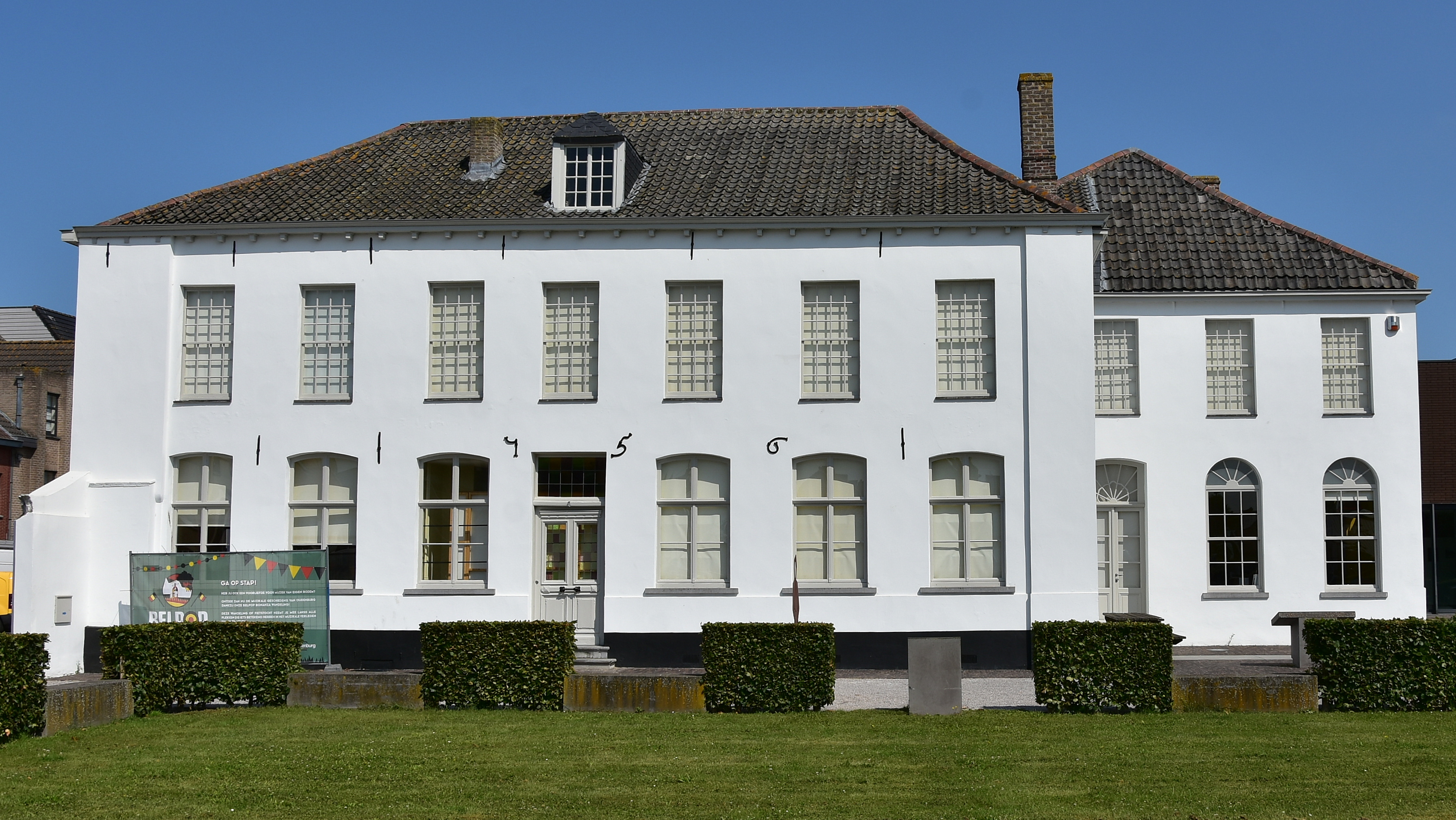
Abbot's building and current Roman Archeological Museum

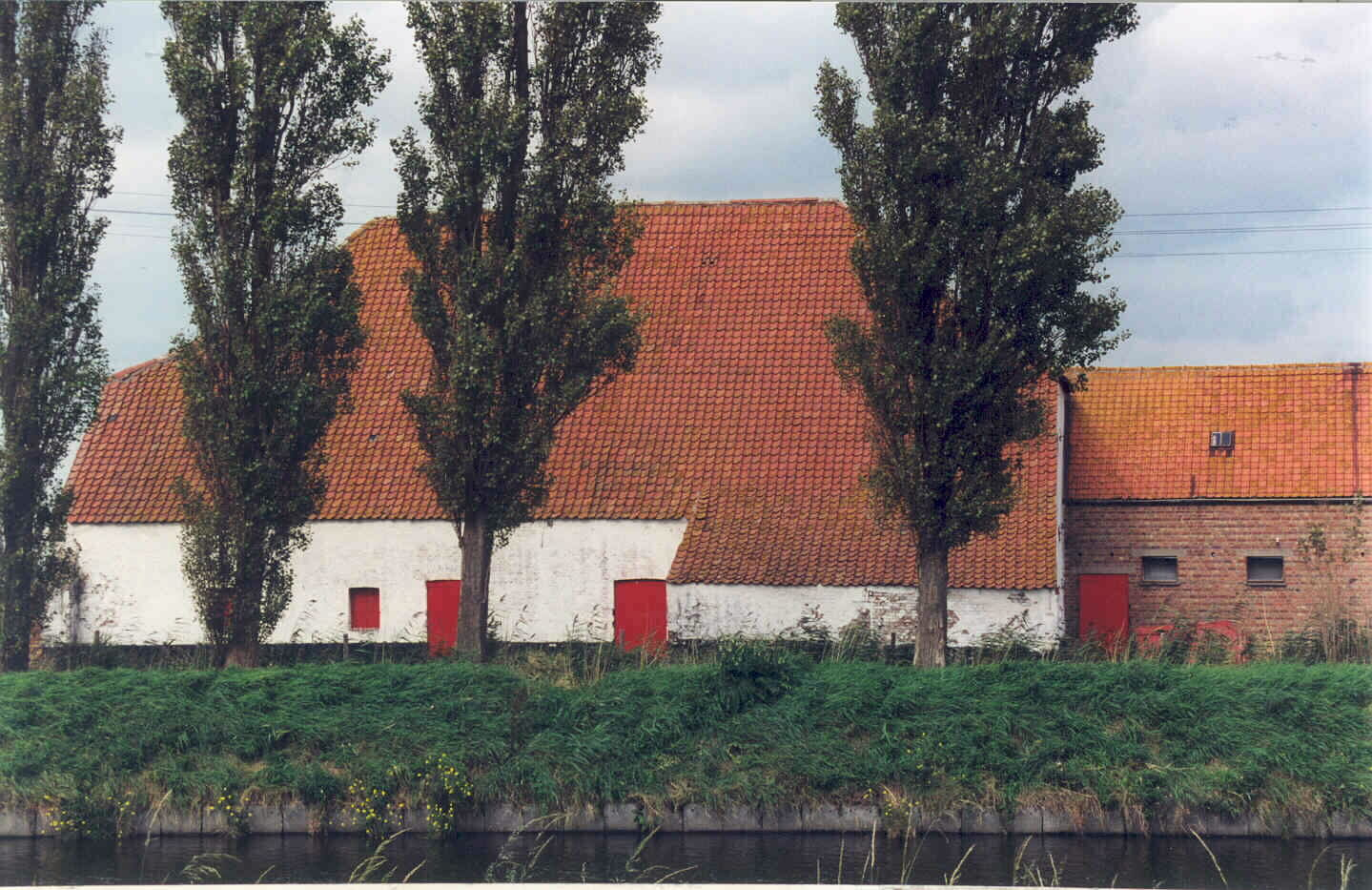
Frisian farmhouse of the local 'Maenhoudthoeve'

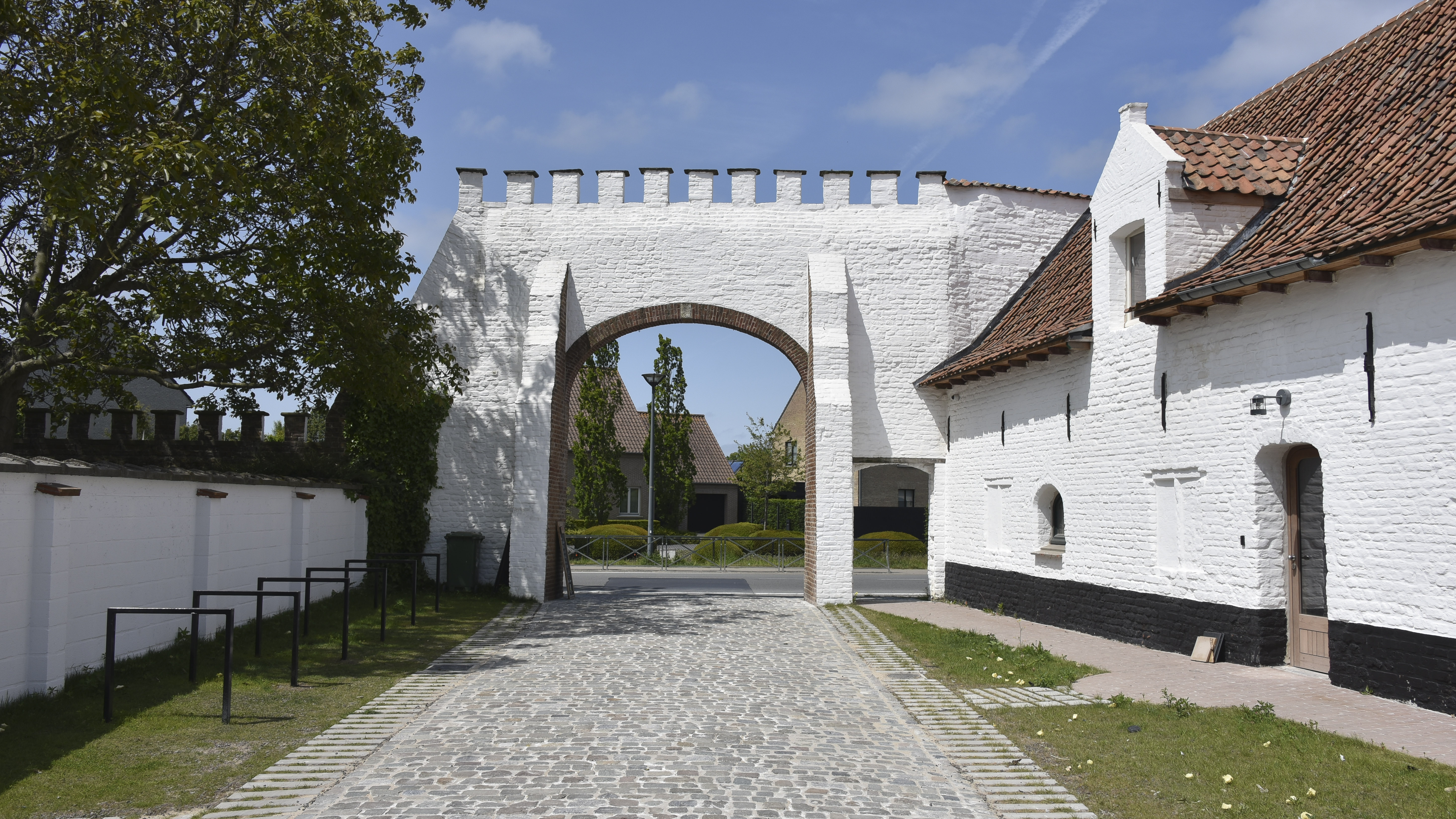
Court of the St.-Peter's abbey's farm

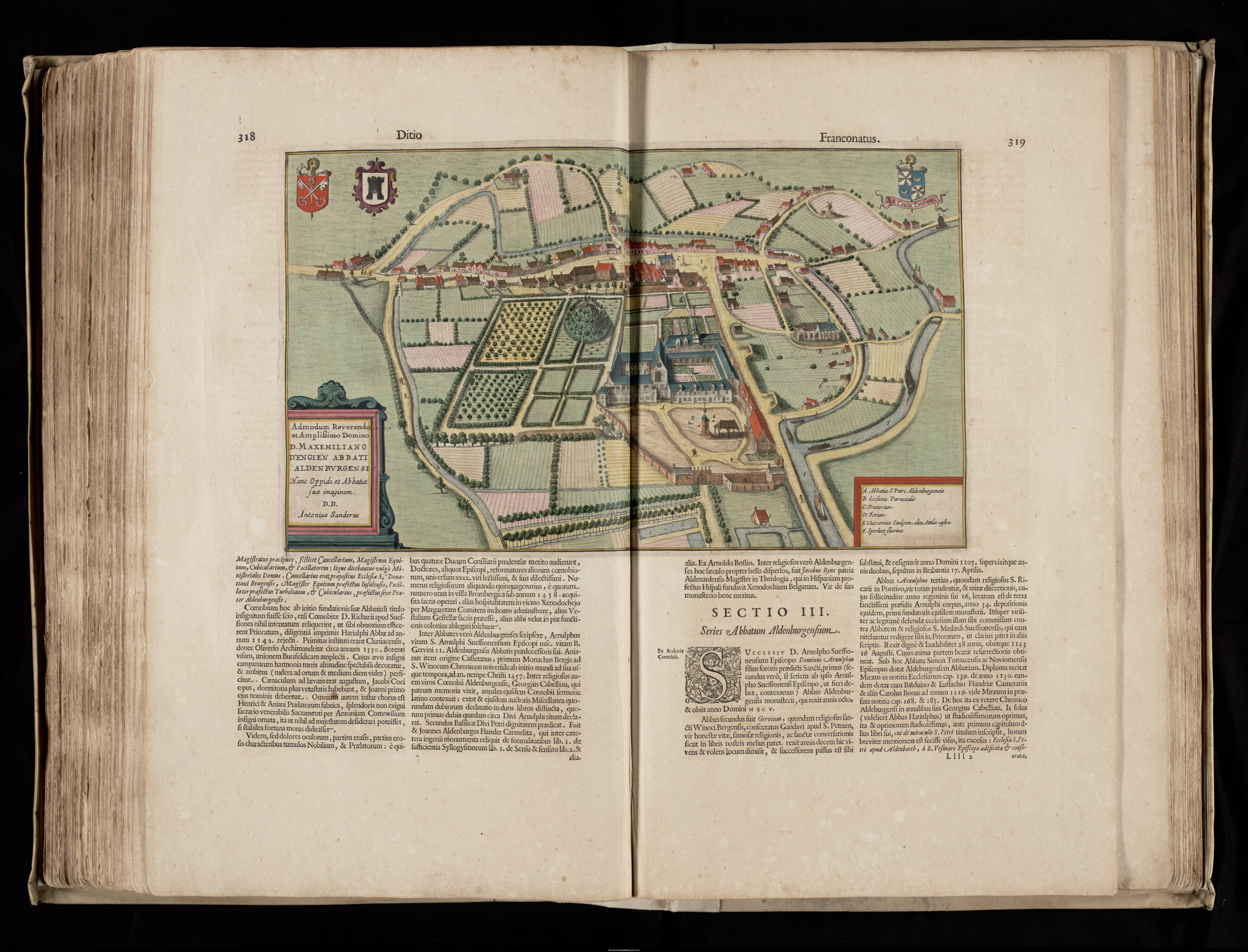
Map of Oudenburg in Flandria illustrata

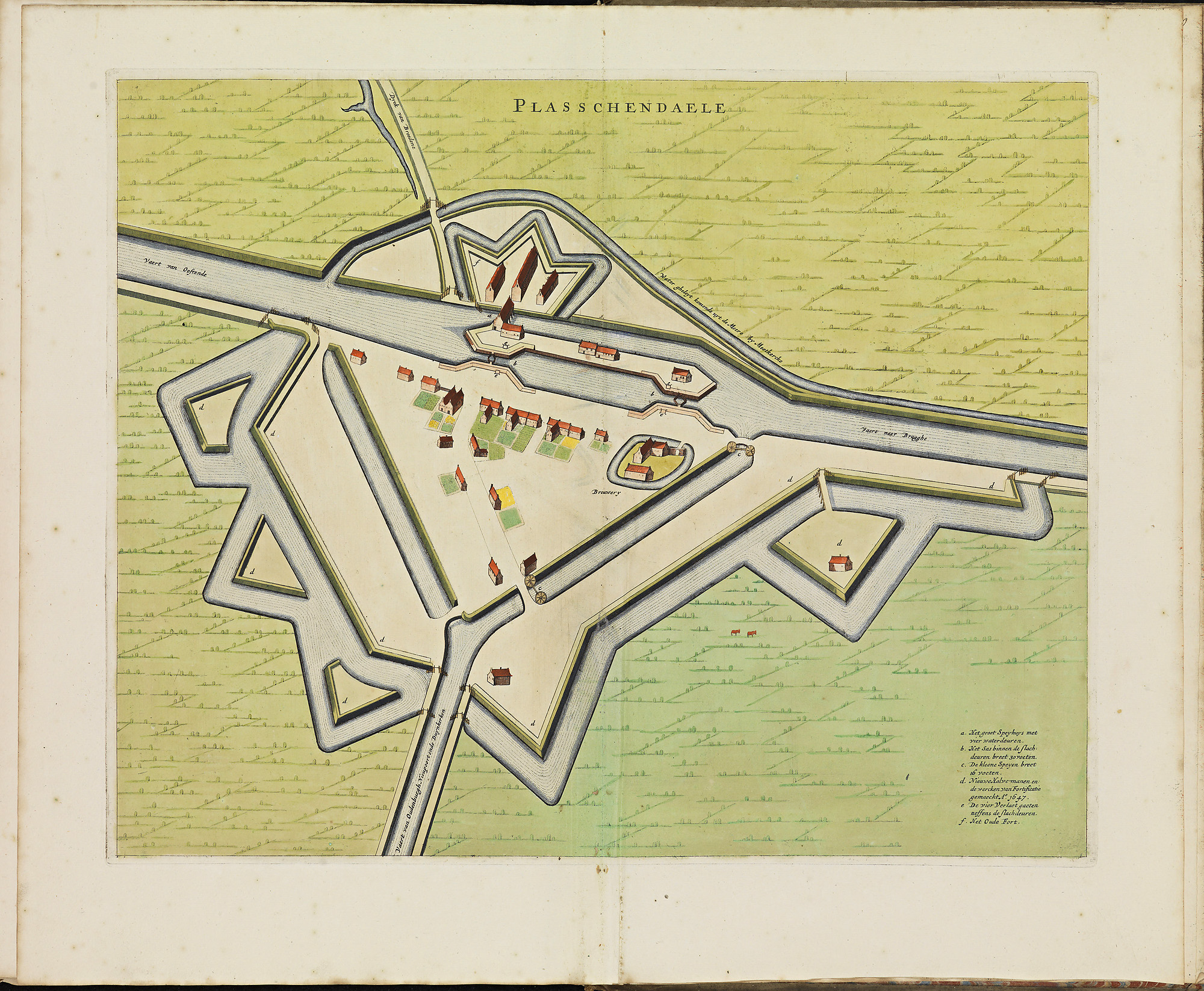
Fort Plassendale (1585-1783)
