= Fort Plassendale =

Belgian former fortress

Coordinates: 51°12′34″N 3°00′14″E

- Fort Plassendale
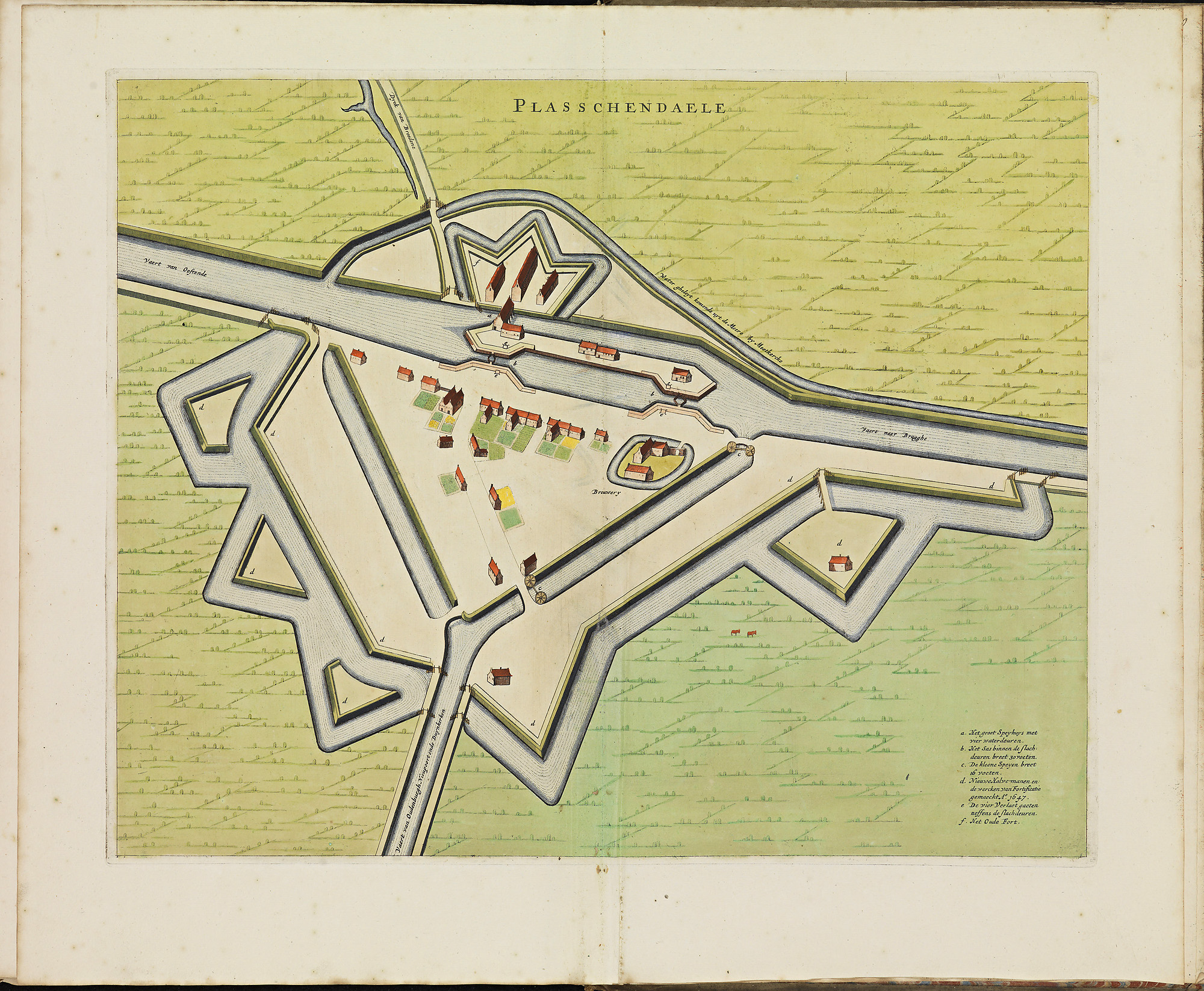
- Map of Plassendale in the 'Stedenboek' (book of cities) by Frederik de Wit (1698)
- Interactive map of Fort Plassendale
- Location: Oudenburg, Belgium
- Designer: Pieter Pourbus
- Type: Fortress
- Beginning date: 1581 (Spanish Netherlands)
- Restored date: 2018-ongoing
- Dismantled date: 1783 (Austrian Netherlands)
- Served during: Eighty Years' War, War of Devolution, Franco-Dutch War, Nine Years' War, War of Spanish Succession, war of Austrian Succession

Fort Plassendale is a former fortress, located in Oudenburg, Belgium at the crosspoint of the Ghent-Bruges-Ostend canal and the Plassendale-Nieuwpoort canal. The fortress served during the Eighty Years' War (1568–1648), the War of Devolution (1667–1668), the Franco-Dutch War (1672–1678), the Nine Years' War (1688–1697), the War of Spanish Succession (1701–1713) and the war of Austrian Succession (1740–1748). Due to its location, it was mainly of logistical importance. As of 2025, the only remaining structure is the so-called Spanish Toll House (Dutch: Spaans Tolhuis), which is being restored since 2018.

The fortress as a whole was built in commission of the Franc of Bruges, according to the plans made by Pieter Pourbus after the Act of abjuration (1581). It served during six different wars and was demolished shortly after the nearby port of Ostend was declared a Free-trade zone by Joseph II in 1781. Among the permanent residents were inn keepers, brewers, lock keepers, contractors, and boat-pulling people (so-called ketsers). In the inheritance documents of the local population, traces were found of porcelain, brought in by the Ostend trading company, as well as pole vaulting material to jump over ditches and specially designed eel forks.

== Discoveries ==
In 2022, inscriptions (graffiti) was discovered behind the plaster of a wall inside the Spanish Toll House. These inscriptions depict a rooster, a later crossed Latin cross, a church with an onion-shaped tower cladding and the text 'parisiens 1707-1708'.

== Gallery ==
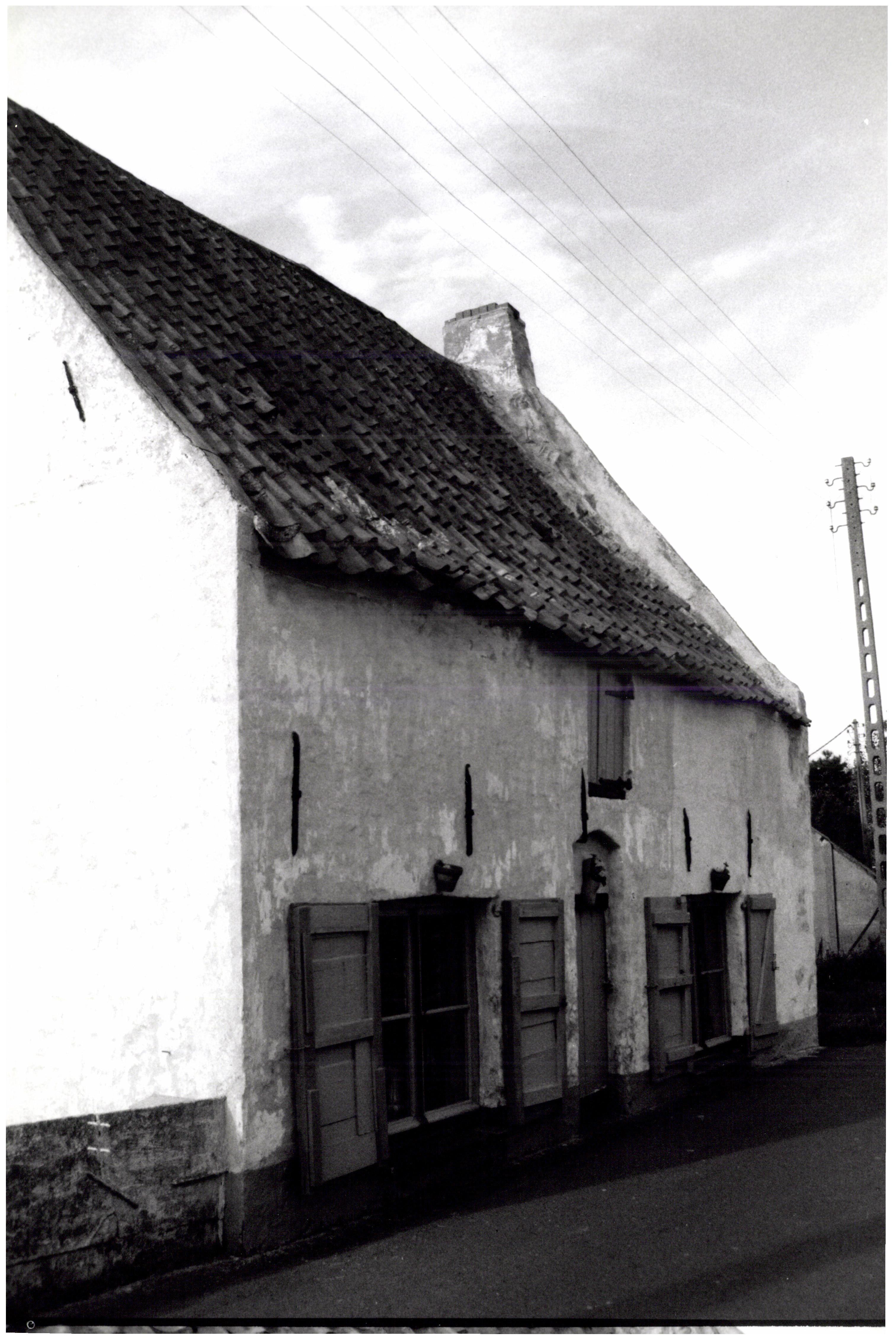
Spanish Toll House (1994)

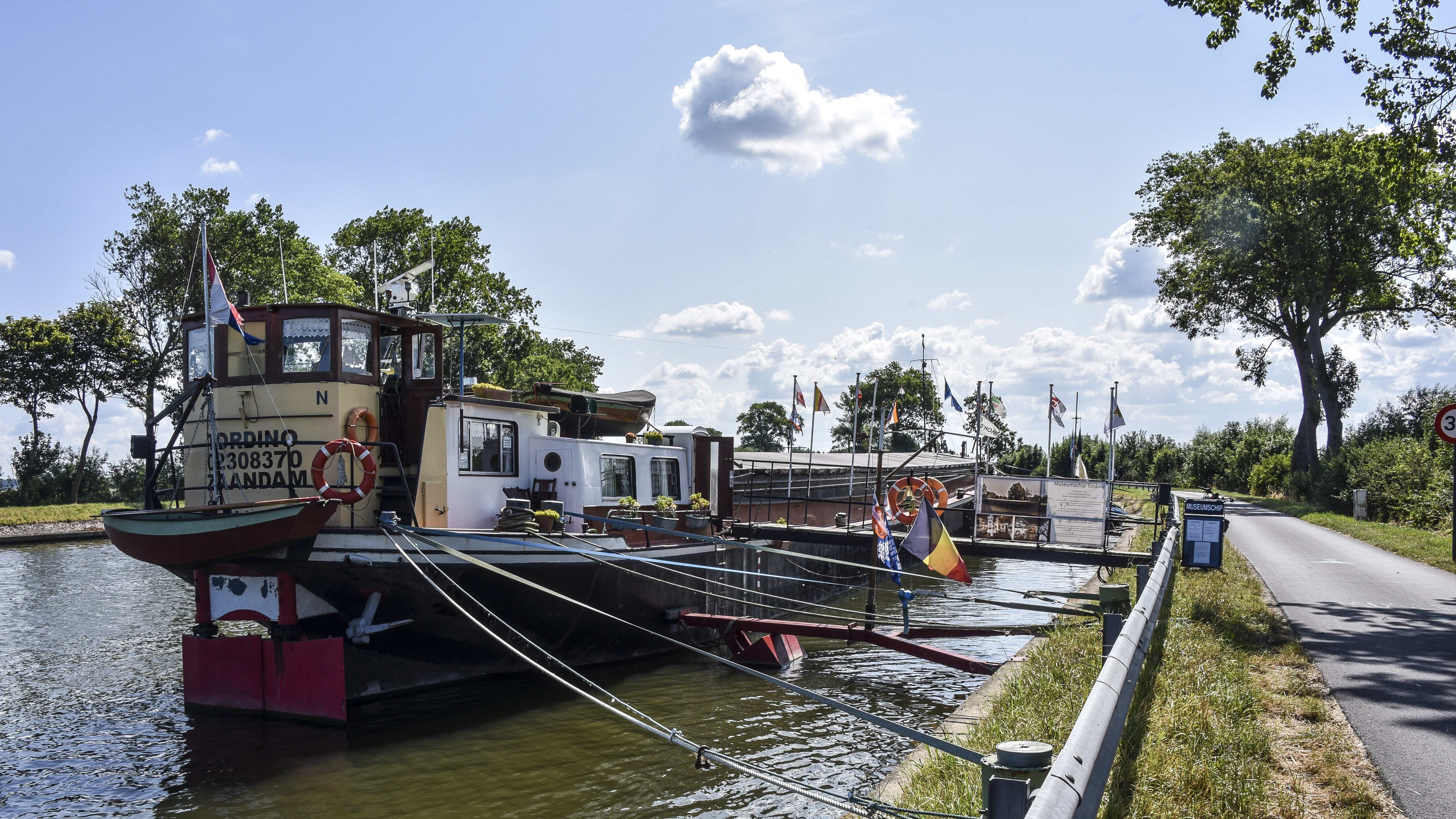
Museum ship Tordino (2023)

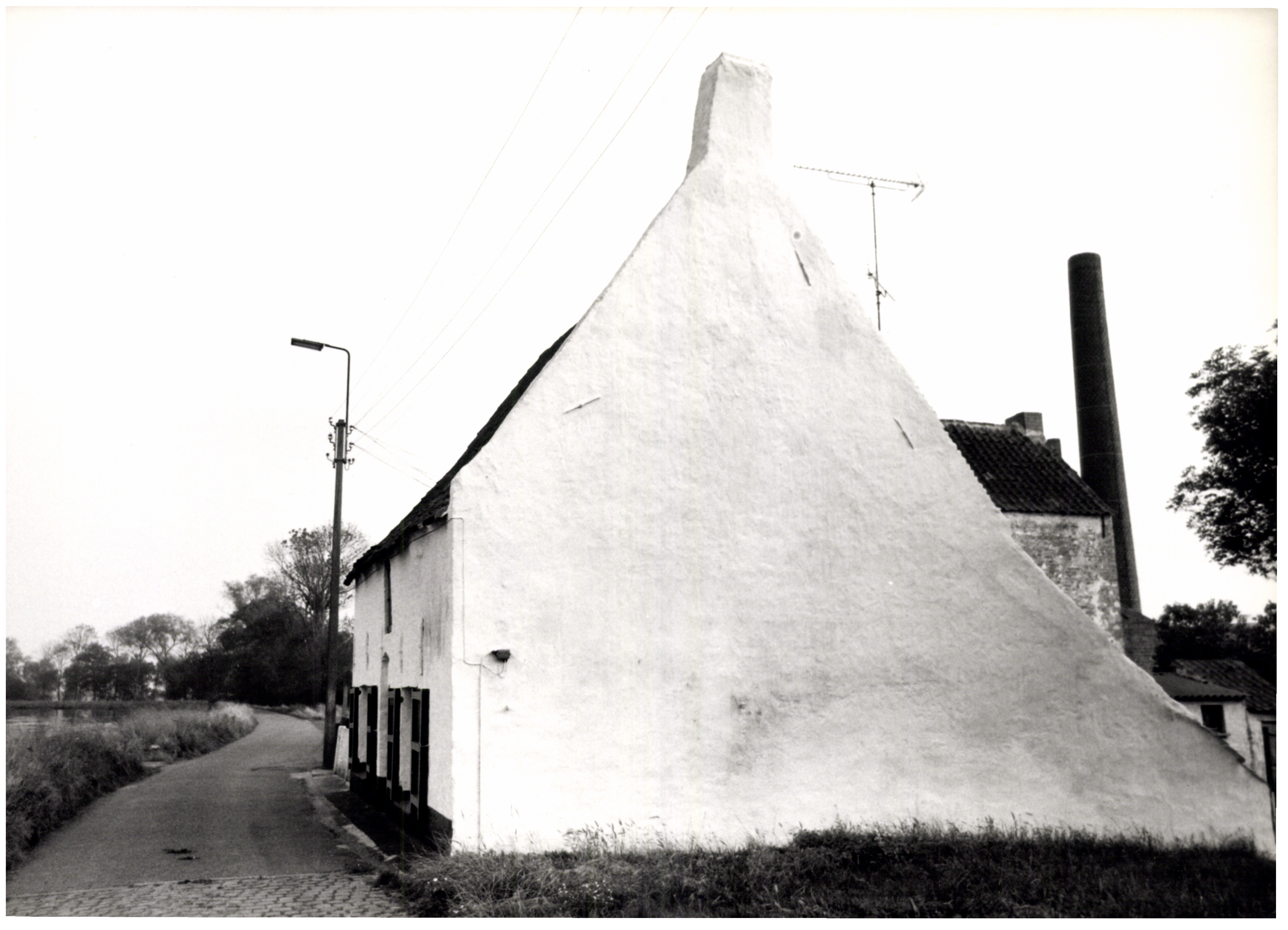
Spanish Toll House (1994)
