= Lautering =

Separating the mash into clear liquid wort and residual grains

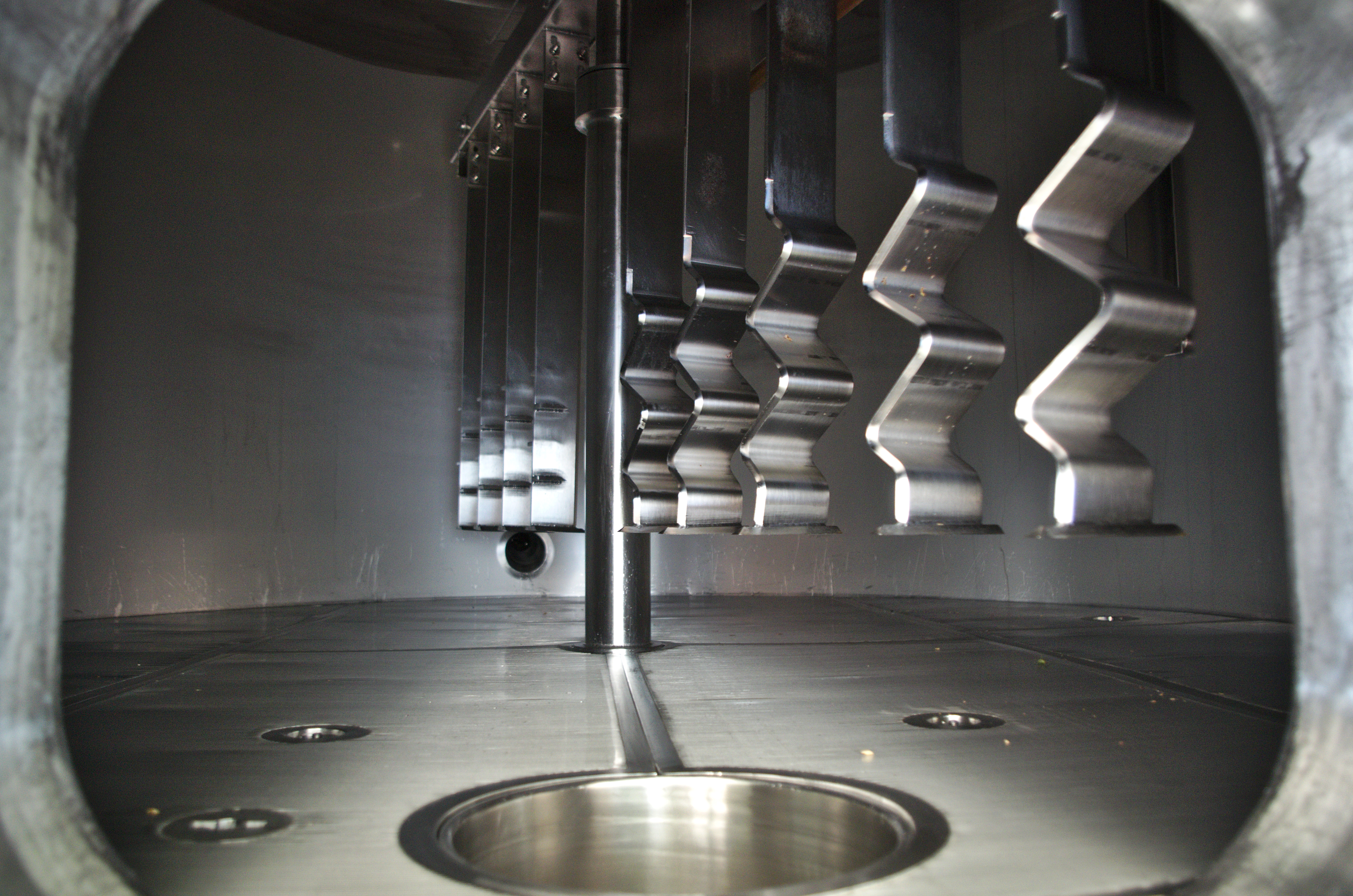
Rake system in a lauter tun.

Lautering (/ˈlaʊtərɪŋ/) is the beer brewing process that separates the mash into clear liquid wort and residual grain. Lautering usually consists of three steps: mashout, recirculation, and sparging.

== Mashout ==
Mashout is the term for raising the temperature of the mash to 77 °C (170 °F). This stops the enzymatic conversion of starches to fermentable sugars, and makes the mash and wort more fluid. Mashout is considered especially necessary if there is less than 3 liters of water per kilogram of grain (3 pints of water per pound of grain), or if the grain is more than 25% wheat or oats. The mashout step can be done by using external heat, or by adding hot water.

== Recirculation ==
Recirculation consists of drawing off wort from the bottom of the mash, and adding it to the top. Lauter tuns typically have slotted bottoms to assist in the filtration process. The mash itself functions much as a sand filter to capture mash debris and proteins. This step is monitored by use of a turbidimeter to measure solids in the wort liquid by their opacity.

== Sparging ==
Sparging is trickling water through the grain to extract sugars. This is a delicate step, as the wrong temperature or pH will extract tannins from the chaff (grain husks) as well, resulting in a bitter brew. Typically, 1.5 times as much water is used for sparging as was for mashing. Sparging is typically conducted in a lauter tun.

English sparging (or batch sparging) drains the wort completely from the mash, after which more water is added, held for a while at 76 °C (169 °F) and then drained again. The second draining can be used in making a lighter-bodied low-alcohol beer known as small beer, or can be added to the first draining. Some homebrewers use English sparging, except that most hold the second batch of water only long enough for the grain bed to settle, after which they recirculate and drain the sparge rinse.

Fly sparging (or German sparging), which is used by commercial breweries and many homebrewers, uses a continuous process sparging. When the wort reaches a desired level (typically about 25 mm or 1 inch) above the grainbed, water is added at the same slow rate that wort is being drained. The wort gradually becomes weaker and weaker, till at a certain point, the brewer stops adding water. This results in greater yields.

== Lauter tun ==
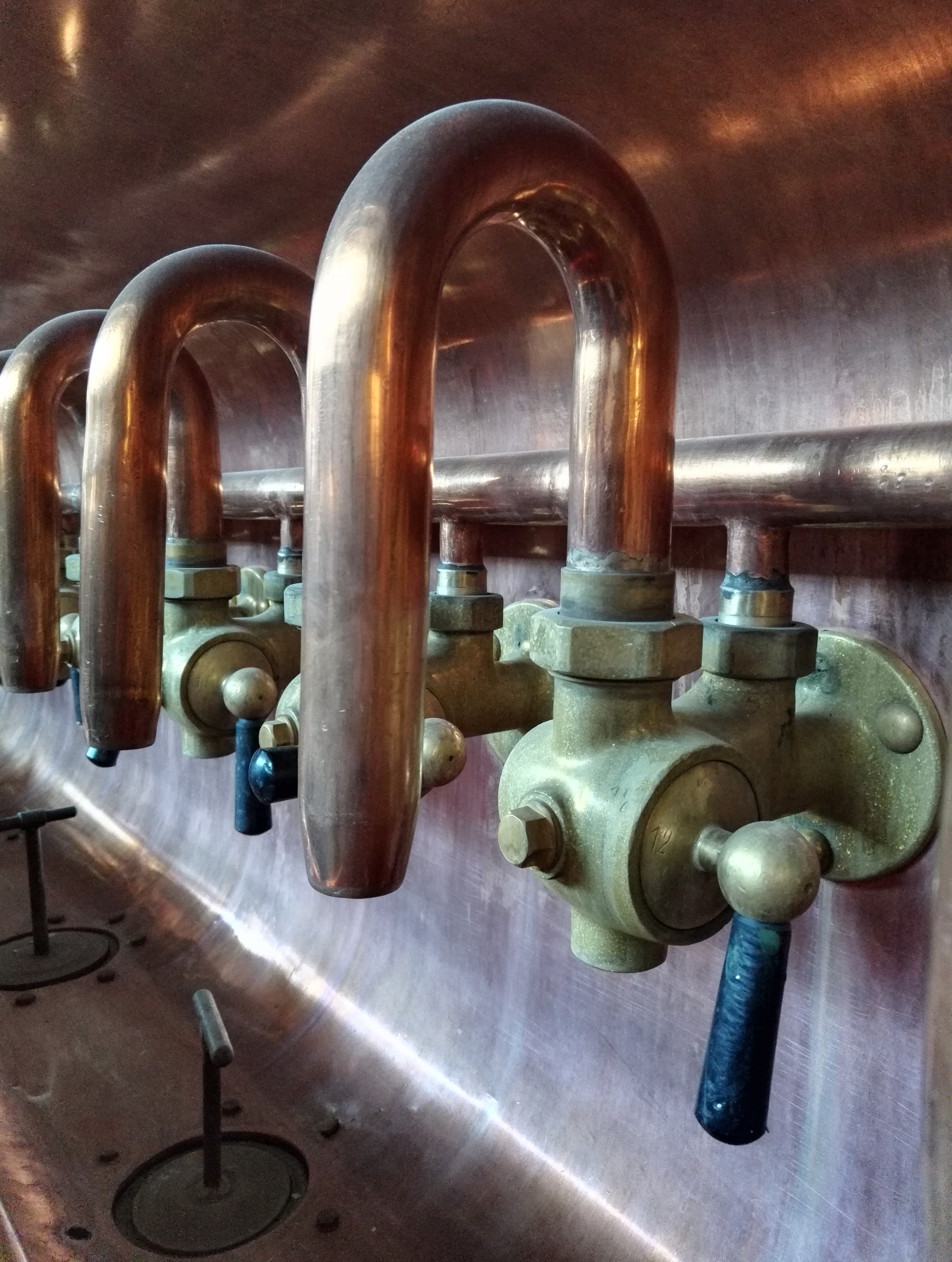
run-off tubes

A lauter tun is the traditional vessel used for separation of the extracted wort. While the basic principle of its operation has remained the same since its first use, technological advances have led to better designed lauter tuns capable of quicker and more complete extraction of the sugars from the grain.

The false bottom in a lauter tun has thin (0.7 to 1.1 mm or 0.028 to 0.043 in) slits to hold back the solids and allow liquids to pass through. The solids, not the false bottom, form a filtration medium and hold back small solids, allowing the otherwise cloudy mash to run out of the lauter tun as a clear liquid. The false bottom of today's lauter tun is made of wedge wire, which can provide a free-flow surface of up to 12% of the bottom of the tun.

The run-off tubes should be evenly distributed across the bottom, with one tube servicing about 1 m^{2} (11 sq ft) of area. Typically, these tubes have a wide, shallow cone around them to prevent compaction of the grain directly above the outlet. In the past, the run-off tubes flowed through swan-neck valves into a wort collection grant. While visually appealing, this system led to a lot of oxygen uptake. Such a system has mostly been replaced either by a central wort-collection vessel or the arrangement of outlet ports into concentric zones, with each zone having a ring-shaped collection pipe. Brewhouses in plain public view, particularly those in brewpubs, often maintain the swan-neck valves and grant for their visual effect.

A good quality lauter tun has rotating rake arms with a central drive unit. Depending on the size of the lauter tun, there can be between two and six rake arms. Cutting blades hang from these arms. The blade is usually wavy and has a plough-like foot. Each blade has its own path around the tun and the whole rake assembly can be raised and lowered. Attached to each of these arms is a flap which can be raised and lowered for pushing the spent grains out of the tun. The brewer, or better yet an automated system, can raise and lower the rake arms depending on the turbidity (cloudiness) of the run-off, and the tightness of the grain bed, as measured by the pressure difference between the top and bottom of the grain bed.

There must be a system for introducing sparge water into the lauter tun. Most systems have a ring of spray heads that ensure an even and gentle introduction of the sparge water. The watering system should not beat down on the grain bed and form a channel.

Large breweries have self-closing inlets on the bottom of the tun through which the mash is transferred to the lauter tun, and one outlet, also on the bottom of the tun, into which the spent grains fall after lautering is complete. Craft breweries often have manways on the side of the mash tun for spent grain removal, which then must be helped along to a large extent by the brewer.

Some small breweries use a combination mash/lauter tun, in which the rake system cannot be implemented because the mixing mechanism for mashing is of higher importance. The stirring blades can be used as an ersatz rake, but typically they cannot be moved up and down, and would disturb the bed too much were they used deep in the grain bed.
