= Hariulfus (Burgundian prince) =

Burgundian prince

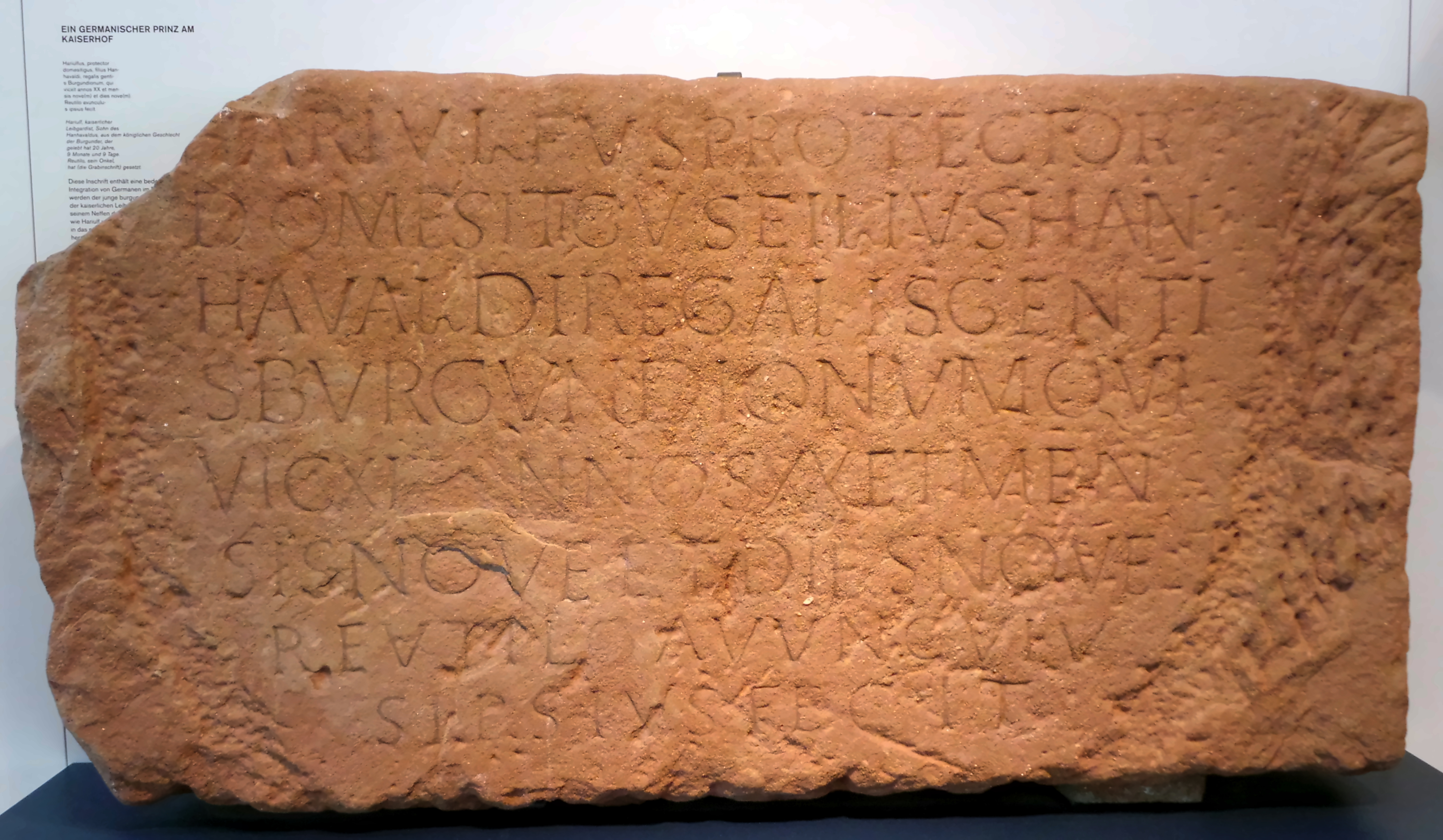
Stele with the funerary inscription for Hariulfus

Hariulf (Latin: Hariulfus) was a Burgundian prince during the 4th century.

An inscription records one Hariulfus, son of Hanhavaldus, of the royal family of the Burgundians (regalis gentis Burgundionum), who was already a protector domesticus when he died at the age of twenty in the imperial court in Augusta Treverorum (Germania Superior), probably under the Roman Emperor Valentinian I (reign 364-375 AD):

Hariulfus protector I domesticus filius Han/havaldi regalis genti/s Burgundionum qui I vicxit(\) annos XX et men/sis(\) nove(m) et dies nove(m). Reutilo avunculu/s ipsius fecit.

This inscription was found in 1877 at Trier, Germany.
