= Arnold of Soissons =

Catholic bishop and saint (1040–1087)

Saint Arnold of Soissons
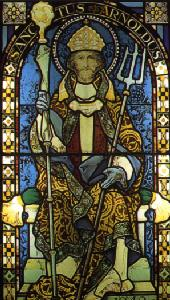
- St. Arnold of Soissons is often depicted with a bishop's mitre and a mash rake

Bishop
- Born: 1040; Tiegem, Flanders
- Died: 1087
- Venerated in: Catholic Church
- Canonized: 6 January 1120 by Callixtus II
- Feast: 14 August
- Attributes: As a bishop, with a mash rake
- Patronage: hop-pickers, beer brewing

Arnold (Arnoul) of Soissons or Arnold or Arnulf of Oudenburg (c. 1040–1087) is a saint of the Catholic Church, the patron saint of hop-pickers, Belgian brewers.

== Biography ==
Arnold, born in Brabant, the son of a certain Fulbertus was first a career soldier before settling at the Benedictine St. Medard's Abbey, Soissons, France. He spent his first three years as a hermit, but later rose to be abbot of the monastery. His hagiography states that he tried to refuse this honor and flee, but was forced by a wolf to return. He then became a priest and in 1080, bishop of Soissons, another honor that he sought to avoid. When his see was occupied by another bishop, rather than fighting, he took the opportunity to retire from public life, founding the Abbey of St. Peter in Oudenburg.

As abbot in Oudenburg, Arnold brewed beer and encouraged local peasants to drink beer, instead of water, due to its "gift of health". The beer normally consumed at breakfast and during the day at this time in Europe was called small beer, having a very low alcohol content, and containing spent yeast. It is likely that people in the local area normally consumed small beer from the monastery, or made their own small beer at the instructions of Arnold and his fellow monks. During one outbreak of sickness, Arnold advised the local people to avoid consuming water, in favor of beer, advice which effectively saved lives.

One miracle tale says, at the time of an epidemic, rather than stand by while the local people fell ill from drinking contaminated water, Arnold had them consume his monastery brews. Because of this, many people in his church survived the plague. This same story is also told of Arnulf or Arnold of Metz, another patron of brewers.

== Legacy ==
There are many depictions of St. Arnold with a mashing rake in his hand, to identify him. For example, the label on "Steenbrugge Abbey" beers has a picture of St Arnold holding a mash rake.

Arnold is honoured in July with a parade in Brussels on the "Day of Beer."

Miracles that were reported at his tomb were investigated and approved by a council at Beauvais in 1121; in 1131 Arnold's relics were transferred to the Church of St. Peter in Aldenburg. St. Arnold's feast day is 14 August.

== See also ==
- Saint Amand - patron saint of wine makers, brewers and bartenders
- Arnulf of Metz - another patron saint of brewers
