= Charles Geleyns =

The Reverend Monsignor Charles Geleyns
- Abbot of the Saint Peter's Abbey of Oudenburg
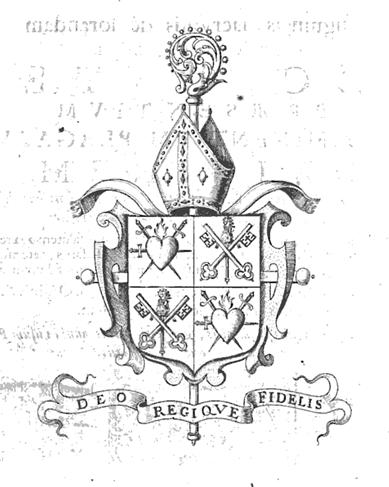
- Coat of arms of abbot Carolus Geleyns in the book Medicus Christianus, dedicated to him by the author
- Church: Roman Catholic
- Other post: diocesan administrator

Charles Geleyns (c. 1610 – 22 August 1677 in Bruges), also named Carolus Geleyns in Latin or Karel Geleyns in Dutch, was a Flemish Roman Catholic priest, Benedictine monk and abbot of the Saint Peter's Abbey of Oudenburg in the Southern Netherlands. In some older sources his last name is mentioned as Gheleyns. Between 1668 and 1671 he fulfilled the duties of the Bishop of Bruges as diocesan administrator.
