= Tiegem =

Coordinates: 50°48′N 3°28′E

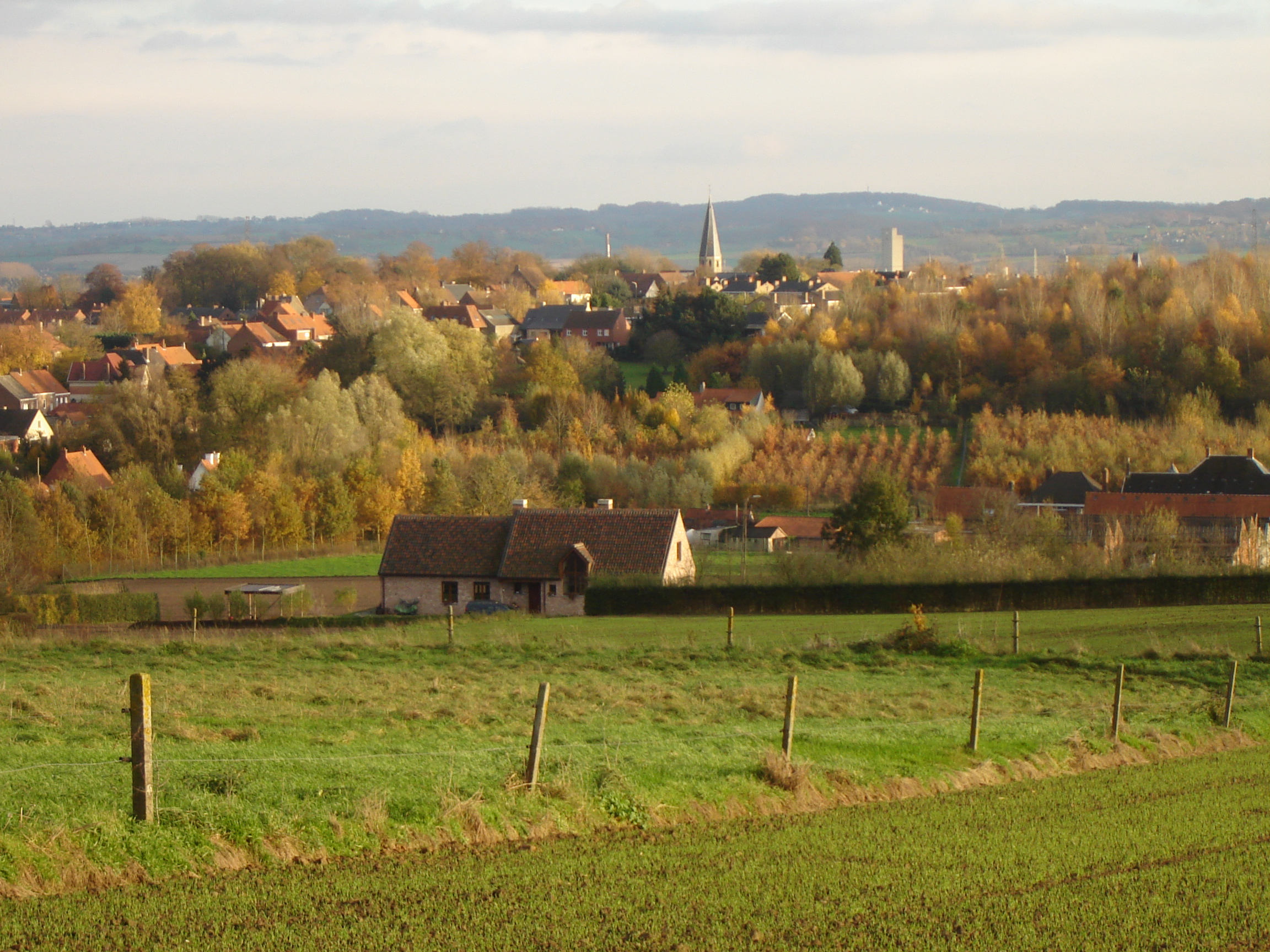
View of Tiegem village

Tiegem (Dutch pronunciation: [ˈtiɣɛm]; also, Tieghem) is a village in the municipality of Anzegem, near Oudenaarde, West Flanders, Belgium. Tiegem was the birthplace of St. Arnold of Soissons.

== Notable people ==
- Arnold of Soissons (c. 1040-1067), religious figure
