= Pyruvate kinase PKLR =

Protein found in humans

PKLR
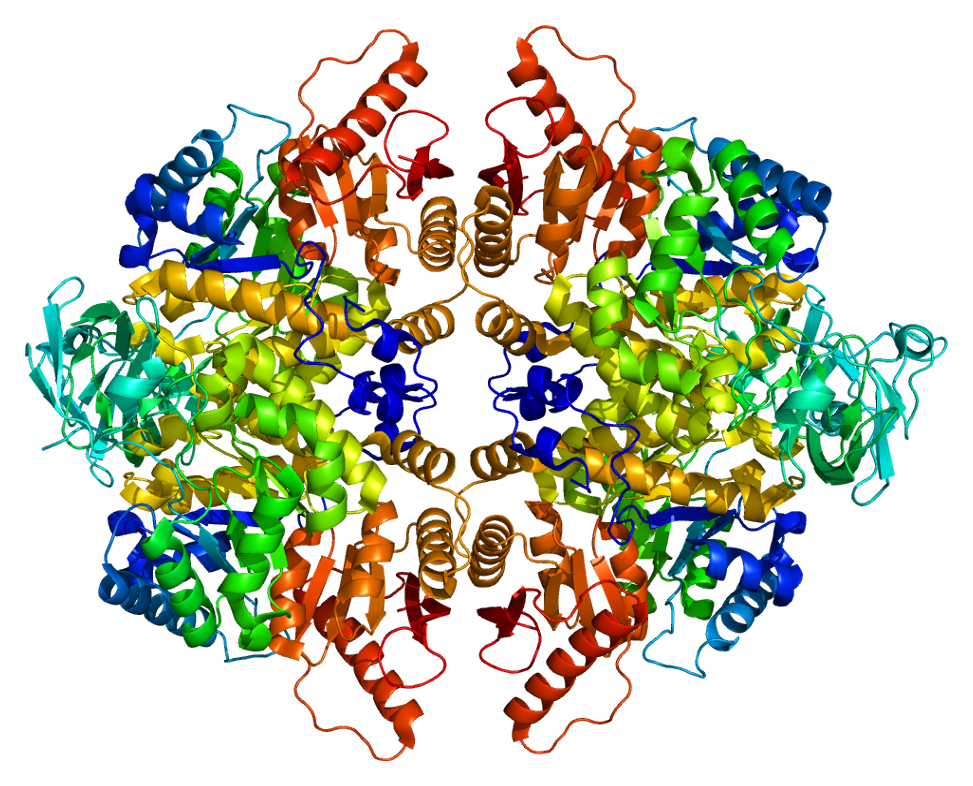

Identifiers
- Aliases: PKLR, PK1, PKL, PKR, PKRL, RPK, pyruvate kinase, liver and RBC, pyruvate kinase L/R
- External IDs: OMIM: 609712; MGI: 97604; GeneCards: PKLR
Available structures
PDB	Ortholog search: PDBe RCSB
PDB	List of PDB id codes 2VGB, 2VGF, 2VGG, 2VGI, 4IMA, 4IP7
Enzyme activity
EC #	BRENDA	ExPASy	KEGG	MetaCyc
2.7.1.40	↗	↗	↗	↗

Gene location (Human)
Chr.	Chromosome 1 (human)
Band	1q22	Start	155,289,293 bp
Band	1q22	End	155,301,438 bp

Gene location (Mouse)
Chr.	Chromosome 3 (mouse)
Band	3 F1|3 39.01 cM	Start	89,043,449 bp
Band	3 F1|3 39.01 cM	End	89,054,091 bp
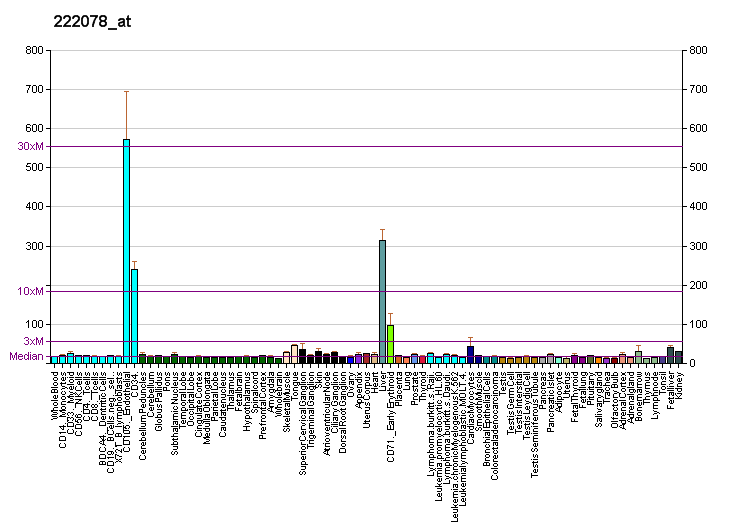

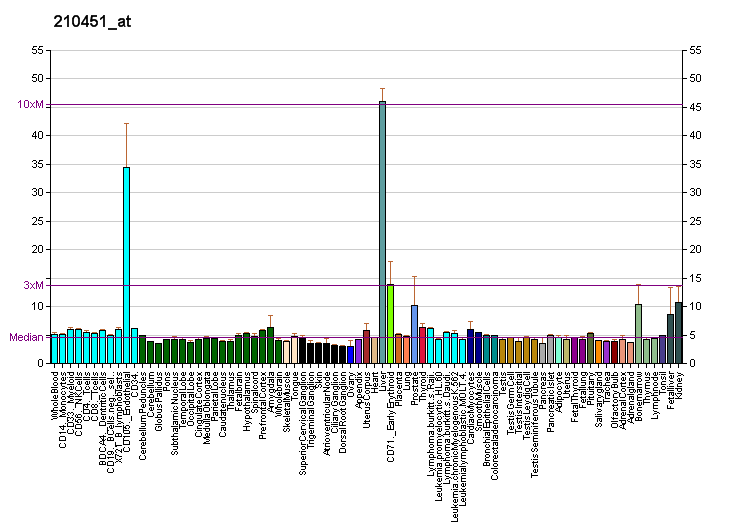

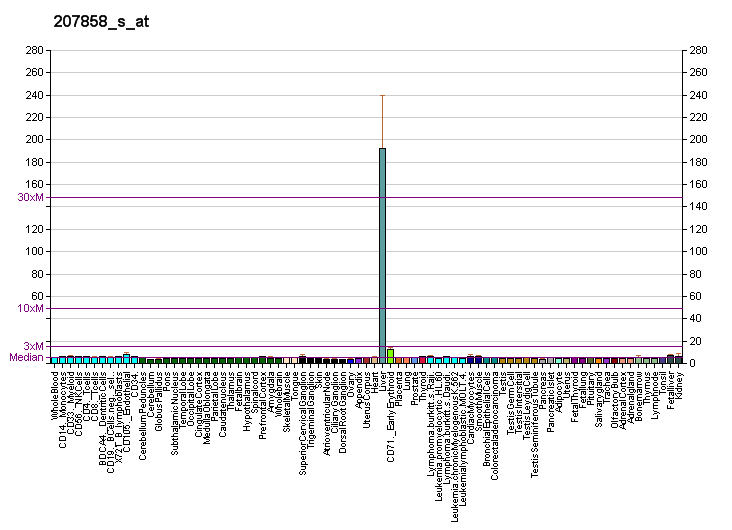
RNA expression pattern
Bgee	Human / Mouse (ortholog); Top expressed in: liver; right lobe of liver; duodenum; bone marrow; bone marrow cell; renal cortex; cerebellum; cerebellar cortex; cerebellar hemisphere; human kidney / Top expressed in: fetal liver hematopoietic progenitor cell; jejunum; yolk sac; duodenum; left lobe of liver; ileum; intestinal villus; epithelium of small intestine; Ileal epithelium; lumbar subsegment of spinal cord; More reference expression data
BioGPS	More reference expression data
Gene ontology
Molecular function	transferase activity; nucleotide binding; potassium ion binding; metal ion binding; kinase activity; catalytic activity; ATP binding; magnesium ion binding; pyruvate kinase activity
Cellular component	cytosol; extracellular exosome; cytoplasm
Biological process	response to ATP; response to hypoxia; phosphorylation; response to nutrient; canonical glycolysis; response to metal ion; pyruvate biosynthetic process; response to heat; response to glucose; response to lithium ion; ATP biosynthetic process; metabolism; response to cAMP; glycolytic process; cellular response to insulin stimulus; cellular response to epinephrine stimulus; carbohydrate metabolic process
Sources:Amigo / QuickGO
Orthologs
Databases	NCBI: entry; OMA: entry
Species	Human	Mouse
Entrez	5313	18770
Ensembl	ENSG00000262785; ENSG00000143627	ENSMUSG00000041237
UniProt	P30613	P53657
RefSeq (mRNA)	NM_000298; NM_181871	NM_001099779; NM_013631
RefSeq (protein)	NP_000289; NP_870986	n/a
Location (UCSC)	Chr 1: 155.29 – 155.3 Mb	Chr 3: 89.04 – 89.05 Mb
PubMed search
- Wikidata
View/Edit Human	View/Edit Mouse

Pyruvate kinase PKLR is an enzyme that in humans is encoded by the PKLR gene.

The protein encoded by this gene is a pyruvate kinase that catalyzes the production of pyruvate and ATP from phosphoenolpyruvate. Defects in this enzyme, due to gene mutations or genetic variations, are the common cause of chronic hereditary nonspherocytic hemolytic anemia (CNSHA or HNSHA). Alternatively spliced transcript variants encoding distinct isoforms have been described.

== As a drug target ==
Etavopivat is an allosteric activator of the erythrocyte PKLR which is currently in phase 3 clinical trials for sickle cell disease and thalassemia.

== Interactive pathway map ==
Click on genes, proteins and metabolites below to link to respective articles. (Note: The interactive pathway map can be edited at WikiPathways: "GlycolysisGluconeogenesis_WP534".)

Glycolysis and Gluconeogenesis edit
