= Creatininase =

Class of enzymes

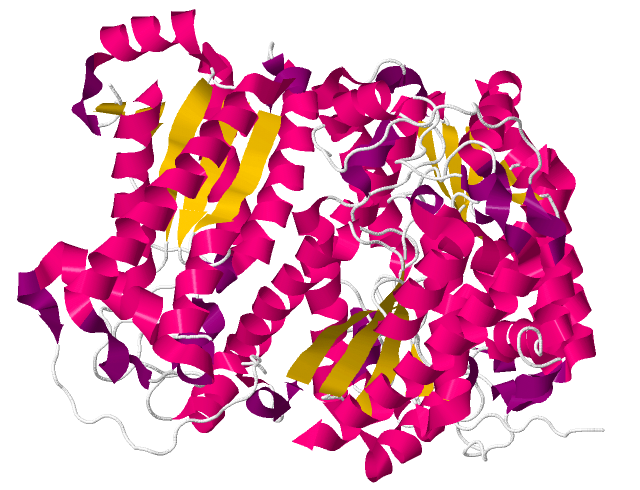
- Crystallographic structure of a creatinine amidohydrolase from Nostoc pruniforme.

Identifiers
- EC no.: 3.5.2.10
- CAS no.: 9025-13-2

Databases
- BRENDA: enzyme data
- ExPASy: NiceZyme view
- KEGG: enzyme entry
- MetaCyc: metabolic pathway
- Rhea: reactions
- PDB structures: RCSB PDB PDBe PDBsum
- Gene Ontology: AmiGO / QuickGO
Search
- PMC: articles
- PubMed: articles
- NCBI: proteins

Creatininase
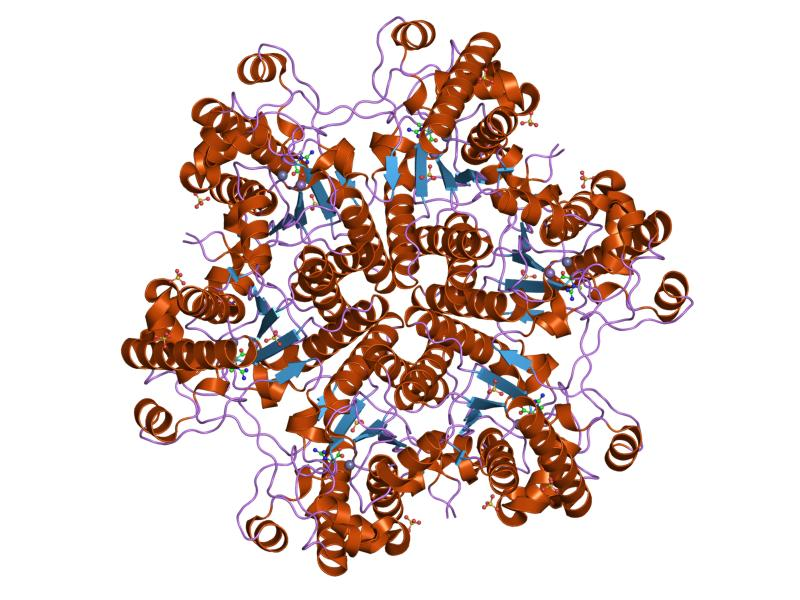
- creatininase-product complex

Identifiers
- Symbol: Creatininase
- Pfam: PF02633
- InterPro: IPR003785
- SCOP2: 1v7z / SCOPe / SUPFAM
Available protein structures:
- PDB: IPR003785 PF02633 (ECOD; PDBsum)
- AlphaFold: IPR003785; PF02633

Creatininase (EC 3.5.2.10) is an enzyme characterised from Pseudomonas putida that catalyses the hydrolysis of creatinine to creatine, which can then be metabolised to urea and sarcosine by creatinase.

creatinine
H_{2}O
H_{2}O
creatine

As levels of creatinine are important markers for chronic kidney disease, the enzyme has been proposed as part of a wearable sensor for the disease.

Creatininase is a member of the urease-related amidohydrolases, the family of hydrolases, those acting on carbon-nitrogen bonds other than peptide bonds, specifically in cyclic amides. The systematic name of this enzyme class is creatinine amidohydrolase. It is also called creatinine hydrolase.

== Structural studies ==
Creatininase from Pseudomonas putida has a core structure consisting of 3-layers, alpha/beta/alpha.

As of late 2007, 4 structures have been solved for this class of enzymes, with PDB accession codes PDB: 1J2T, PDB: 1J2U, PDB: 1Q3K, and PDB: 1V7Z.
