= Etavopivat =

Clinical data
- Other names: FT-4202; NN 7535; NN-7536; NN7535

Legal status
- Legal status: investigational

Identifiers
- IUPAC name: (2S)-1-[5-(2,3-dihydro-[1,4]dioxino[2,3-b]pyridin-7-ylsulfonyl)-1,3,4,6-tetrahydropyrrolo[3,4-c]pyrrol-2-yl]-3-hydroxy-2-phenylpropan-1-one
- CAS Number: 2245053-57-8
- PubChem CID: 135338378
- IUPHAR/BPS: 11975
- DrugBank: DB18176
- ChemSpider: 115009606
- UNII: V4E0A9M44Q
- KEGG: D12362
- ChEBI: CHEBI:758230
- ChEMBL: ChEMBL4650332

Chemical and physical data
- Formula: C_{22}H_{23}N_{3}O_{6}S
- Molar mass: 457.50 g·mol^{−1}
- 3D model (JSmol): Interactive image
- SMILES: C1COC2=C(O1)C=C(C=N2)S(=O)(=O)N3CC4=C(C3)CN(C4)C(=O)[C@H](CO)C5=CC=CC=C5
- InChI: InChI=InChI=1S/C22H23N3O6S/c26-14-19(15-4-2-1-3-5-15)22(27)24-10-16-12-25(13-17(16)11-24)32(28,29)18-8-20-21(23-9-18)31-7-6-30-20/h1-5,8-9,19,26H,6-7,10-14H2/t19-/m1/s1; Key:KZFFYEPYCVDOGE-LJQANCHMSA-N

Etavopivat is an investigational new drug that is being evaluated by FORMA Therapeutics for the treatment of sickle cell disease and thalassemia. It is an allosteric activator of the erythrocyte pyruvate kinase R (PKR) enzyme.

== Clinical trials ==
Etavopivat is in phase 3 clinical trials for sickle cell disease and thalassemia.
