= Zymology =

Study of fermentation and its uses

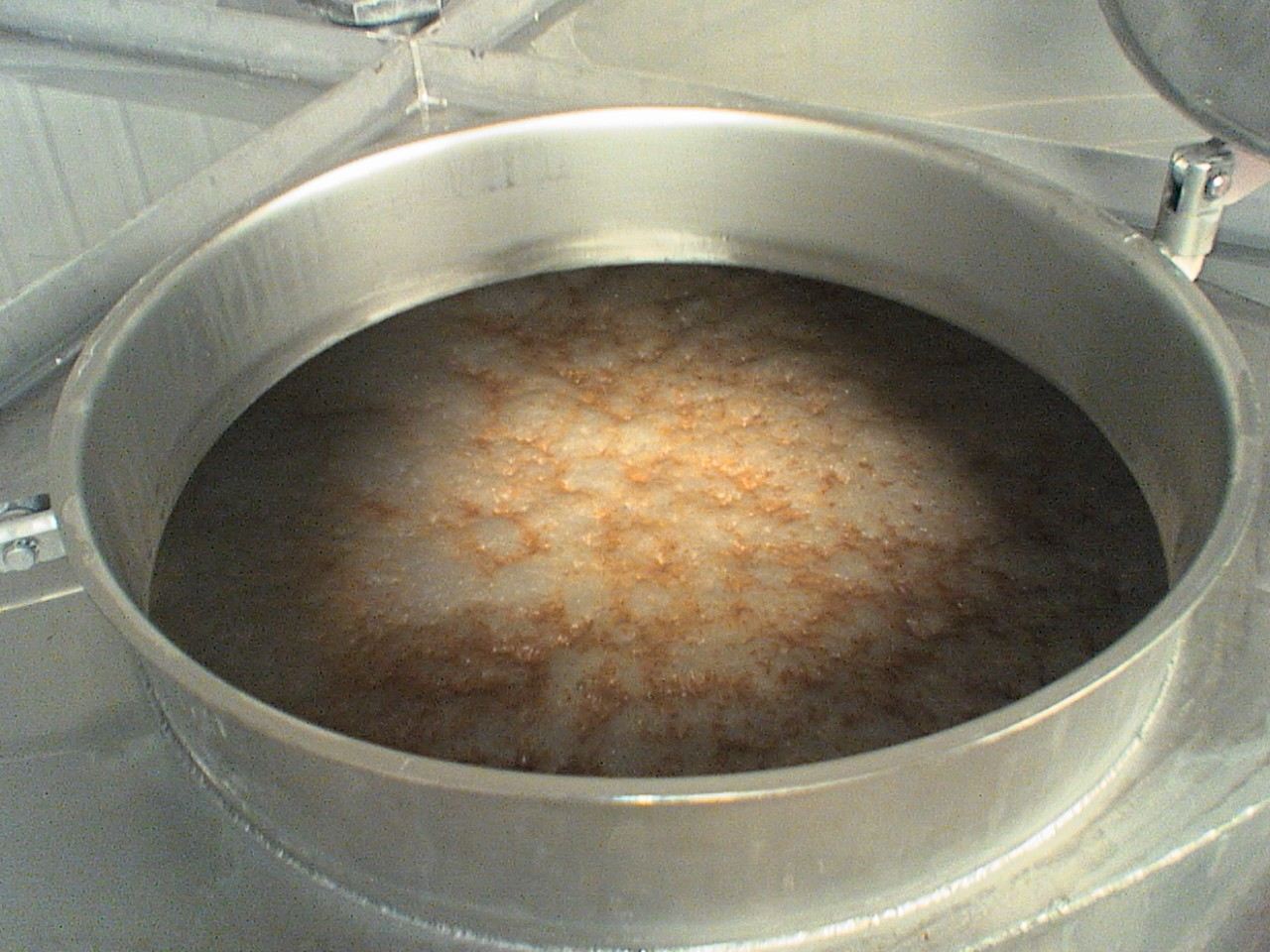
Beer fermenting at a brewery

Zymology, also known as zymurgy, (Note: From the Ancient Greek: ζύμωσις + ἔργον, "the workings of fermentation".) is an applied science that studies the biochemical process of fermentation and its practical uses. Common topics include the selection of fermenting yeast and bacteria species and their use in brewing, wine making, fermenting milk, and the making of other fermented foods.

== Fermentation ==
Fermentation can be simply defined, in the context of brewing, as the conversion of sugar molecules into ethanol and carbon dioxide by yeast.

$\mathrm{ C_6 H_{12} O_6 \rightarrow 2 CO_2 + 2C_2 H_5 OH }$

Fermentation practices have led to the discovery of ample microbial and antimicrobial cultures on fermented foods and products.

== History ==
French chemist Louis Pasteur was the first 'zymologist' when in 1857 he connected yeast to fermentation. Pasteur originally defined fermentation as "respiration without air".

Pasteur performed careful research and concluded:

Je pense que la fermentation alcoolique ne se produit jamais sans une organization simultanée, une développement, une multiplication de cellules … . Si l'on me demandai en quoi consiste la réaction chimique par laquelle le sucre et décomposé … je l'ignore complètement.

I am of the opinion that alcoholic fermentation never occurs without simultaneous organization, development and multiplication of cells … . If asked, in what consists the chemical act whereby the sugar is decomposed … I am completely ignorant of it.

— La Fermentation Alcoolique

The German Eduard Buchner, winner of the 1907 Nobel Prize in chemistry, later determined that fermentation was actually caused by a yeast secretion, which he termed 'zymase'.

The research efforts undertaken by the Danish Carlsberg scientists greatly accelerated the understanding of yeast and brewing. The Carlsberg scientists are generally acknowledged as having jump-started the entire field of molecular biology.

== Products ==
- All alcoholic drinks including beer, cider, kombucha, kvass, mead, perry, tibicos, wine, pulque, hard liquors (brandy, rum, vodka, sake, schnapps), and soured by-products including vinegar and alegar
- Yeast leavened breads including sourdough, salt-rising bread, and others
- Cheese and some dairy products including kefir and yogurt
- Chocolate
- Coffee
- Dishes including fermented fish, such as garum, surströmming, and Worcestershire sauce
- Some vegetables such as kimchi, some types of pickles (most are not fermented though), and sauerkraut
- A wide variety of fermented foods made from soybeans, including fermented bean paste, nattō, tempeh, and soya sauce
