= Enzyme inducer =

Compound that increases the activity of a protein

An enzyme inducer is a type of drug that increases the metabolic activity of an enzyme, either by binding to the enzyme and activating it, or by increasing the expression of the gene coding for the enzyme. One of the examples of enzyme inducers can be Cytochrome P450 enzymes, which will help to metabolize the drugs faster in the organism.

Enzyme inducers are important in the pharmaceutical field to learn drug interactions. Studies show that certain drugs will increase the activity of the inducer, examples could be antibiotics. It is the opposite of an enzyme repressor. There are specific types of enzyme inducers that create cytoprotective pathways that play a role in prevention and treatment of cancer and other diseases including cardiovascular disease and neurodegenerative diseases.

Enzyme inducers can be either naturally occurring or synthetically made. These inducers can be naturally occurring, like compounds in cruciferous vegetables, or synthetically developed for therapeutic purposes.

== See also ==
- Enzyme activator
- Enzyme inhibitor
- Regulation of gene expression
