= Eduard Buchner =

German chemist (1860–1917)

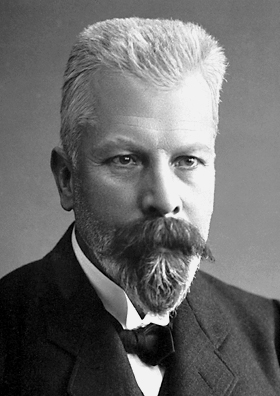
- Buchner in 1907
- Born: 20 May 1860; Munich, Kingdom of Bavaria
- Died: 13 August 1917 (aged 57); Focșani, Kingdom of Romania
- Education: Ludwig-Maximilians-Universität München
- Known for: Cell-free fermentation, Buchner ring expansion, Büchner–Curtius–Schlotterbeck reaction, Enzymes, Zymase
- Awards: Liebig Medal (1905); Nobel Prize in Chemistry (1907)
- Scientific career
- Fields: Biochemistry
- Workplaces: Ludwig-Maximilians-Universität München; Kiel University; Agricultural University of Berlin; University of Tübingen; University of Breslau; University of Würzburg
- Doctoral advisor: Theodor Curtius

Eduard Buchner (German: [ˈeːduaʁt ˈbuːxnɐ]; 20 May 1860 – 13 August 1917) was a German chemist and expert on fermentation (sometimes called a zymologist), awarded the 1907 Nobel Prize in Chemistry for his work on fermentation.

== Biography ==
=== Early years ===
Buchner was born in Munich to a physician and Doctor Extraordinary of Forensic Medicine. His older brother was the bacteriologist Hans Ernst August Buchner. In 1884, he began studies of chemistry with Adolf von Baeyer and of botany with Carl Nägeli, at the Botanic Institute in Munich. After a period working with Otto Fischer (cousin of Emil Fischer) at the University of Erlangen, Buchner was awarded a doctorate from the Ludwig-Maximilians-Universität München in 1888 under Theodor Curtius.

=== Academics ===
Buchner was appointed assistant lecturer in the organic laboratory of Adolf von Baeyer in 1889 at the Ludwig-Maximilians-Universität München. In 1891, he was promoted to lecturer at the same university.

In the autumn of 1893, Buchner moved to Kiel University and appointed professor in 1895. In the next year, he was appointed Professor Extraordinary for Analytical and Pharmaceutical Chemistry in the chemical laboratory of H. von Pechmann at the University of Tübingen.

In October 1898, he was appointed to the Chair of General Chemistry in the Agricultural University of Berlin, fully training his assistants by himself, and received his habilitation in 1900.

In 1909, he was transferred to the University of Breslau (reorganised to be University of Wrocław in 1945), and in 1911, he moved to University of Würzburg.

==== The Nobel Prize ====
Buchner received the Nobel Prize in Chemistry in 1907. The experiment for which Buchner won the Nobel Prize consisted of producing a cell-free extract of yeast cells and showing that this "press juice" could ferment sugar. This dealt yet another blow to vitalism by showing that the presence of living yeast cells was not needed for fermentation. The cell-free extract was produced by combining dry yeast cells, quartz and kieselguhr and then pulverizing the yeast cells with a pestle and mortar. This mixture would then become moist as the yeast cells' contents would come out of the cells. Once this step was done, the moist mixture would be put through a press and the resulting "press juice" had glucose, fructose, or maltose added and carbon dioxide was seen to evolve, sometimes for days. Microscopic investigation revealed no living yeast cells in the extract. Buchner hypothesized that yeast cells secrete proteins into their environment in order to ferment sugars, but it was later found that fermentation occurs inside the yeast cells. Maria Manasseina claimed to have discovered free-cell fermentation a generation earlier than Buchner, but Buchner and Rapp considered that she was subjectively convinced of the existence of an enzyme of fermentation, and that her experimental evidence was unconvincing.

=== Personal life ===
Buchner married Lotte Stahl in 1900. At the outbreak of the First World War, he volunteered in the Imperial German Army and rose to the rank of Major, commanding a munition-transport unit on the Western and then Eastern Front. In March 1916, he returned to the University of Würzburg. In April 1917, he volunteered again. On 11 August 1917, while stationed at Focșani, Romania, he was hit by a shell fragment in the left thigh and died in a field hospital two days later. He died in the Battle of Mărășești and is buried in the cemetery of German soldiers in Focșani.

Though it is believed by some that the Büchner flask and the Büchner funnel are named for him, they are actually named for the industrial chemist Ernst Büchner.

== Publications ==
- Eduard Buchner (1897). "Alkoholische Gährung ohne Hefezellen (Vorläufige Mitteilung)". Berichte der Deutschen Chemischen Gesellschaft. 30: 117–124. doi:10.1002/cber.18970300121.
- Eduard Buchner, Rudolf Rapp (1899). "Alkoholische Gährung ohne Hefezellen". Berichte der Deutschen Chemischen Gesellschaft. 32 (2): 2086–2094. doi:10.1002/cber.189903202123.
- Robert Kohler (1971). "The background to Eduard Buchner's discovery of cell-free fermentation". Journal of the History of Biology. 4 (1): 35–61. doi:10.1007/BF00356976. PMID 11609437. S2CID 46573308.
- Robert Kohler (1972). "The reception of Eduard Buchner's discovery of cell-free fermentation". Journal of the History of Biology. 5 (2): 327–353. doi:10.1007/BF00346663. PMID 11610124. S2CID 34944527.

== See also ==
- History of biochemistry
