= Creatinase =

Class of enzymes

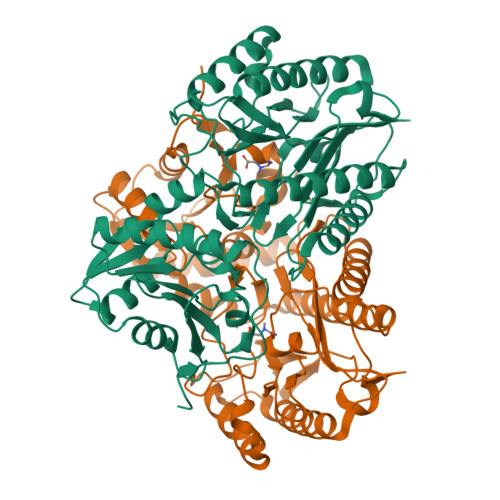
- PDB image of creatinase enzyme structure as described by Hoeffken et al. 1993

Identifiers
- EC no.: 3.5.3.3
- CAS no.: 37340-58-2

Databases
- BRENDA: enzyme data
- ExPASy: NiceZyme view
- KEGG: enzyme entry
- MetaCyc: metabolic pathway
- Rhea: reactions
- PDB structures: RCSB PDB PDBe PDBsum
- Gene Ontology: AmiGO / QuickGO
Search
- PMC: articles
- PubMed: articles
- NCBI: proteins

In enzymology, creatinase (EC 3.5.3.3), also known as creatine amidinohydrolase, is classified as a hydrolase enzyme, acting on carbon-nitrogen bonds in linear amidines. Specifically, this enzyme breaks the amidino C-N bond in creatine, producing sarcosine and urea. Creatinase activity has been described in several bacteria species, most notably Pseudomonas putida, where the enzyme plays a key role in the metabolism of creatine as a nitrogen and carbon source.

== Organisms and discovery ==
Creatinase was first identified by Roche, Lacombe, & Girard in 1950 in Pseudomonas eisenbergii and P. ovalis. It is produced by other bacterial genera including Bacillus, Flavobacterium, Micrococcus, Alcaligenes, Clostridium, Arthrobacter, and Paracoccus, and is produced by other species of Pseudomonas as well.

In P. putida, creatinase is coded for by the creA gene and enables growth on creatine as the sole nitrogen source. Expression of creA is regulated by CahR, an AraC/GAT-R regulator that activates gene expression in the presence of creatine. This gene has also been cloned into Escherichia coli.

== Structure ==
Creatinase is a homodimeric enzyme with a calculated molecular mass of approximately 94,000 ± 2,000 Da. Each monomer subunit contains 403 amino-acid residues split between two distinct structural domains. The enzyme was purified and crystallized in 1976 after being extracted from P. putida.

=== Domains ===
Creatinase has two domains:

- A small N-terminal domain (160 amino-acid residues)
- A large C-terminal domain (240 amino-acid residues)

Each noncovalently-associated monomer subunit consists of both domains. The subunits interact with each other through about 20 hydrogen bonds and four ion pairs, providing stability to the dimer. The two domains in each monomer subunit are more loosely connected, with only six hydrogen bonds and one ion pair between them, and no intra- or intermolecular disulfide bonds.

Looking more closely at the two domains, the following structures were described in 1988:

- N-terminal domain
  - A central, 7-stranded β-pleated sheet with 6 short α-helices on the outside
  - A strong left-handed twist of 100 degrees between the terminal strands
  - Parallel and antiparallel alignment of the strands
  - Four α-helices on the side of the β-sheet that faces the other domain, and
  - Two α-helices on the side of the β-sheet that faces solvent
- C-terminal domain
  - A 6-stranded antiparallel β-half-barrel with 4 α-helices on the outside and 2 extended loops
  - A trough created by the strands in the β-half-barrel, hosting the active site
  - All four α-helices on the outside of the trough for stabilization, and
  - A pseudo 2-fold symmetry axis

It has been suggested, following inhibition experiments, that a sulfhydryl group is located on or near the active site of the enzyme.

== Reaction pathway ==
Creatinase catalyzes the hydrolysis reaction:

creatine
H_{2}O
sarcosine
+
urea

=== Substrate binding ===
Creatine binds inside the β-half-barrel trough of the large C-terminal domain, forming hydrogen bonds between its amidino and carboxyl groups and the enzyme's amino-acid residues. A metal ion, either Zn^{2+} or Mn^{2+}, is used to stabilize the substrate and polarize the amidino group.

=== Splitting of water ===
The bound metal ion, plus a glutamate-histidine pair, activates and splits a water molecule from the surrounding solution. This generates a hydroxide ion within the active site.

=== Breaking the C-N bond and product release ===
The hydroxide ion joins with the carbon atom of the creatine's amidino group, creating a tetrahedral intermediate product. This intermediate product collapses and breaks the C-N bond, releasing urea. The remainder of the molecule rearranges to form sarcosine, and both products diffuse from the active site pocket.

== Importance in metabolism ==
For soil bacteria, creatinase allows for organisms to process the carbon and nitrogen that come from animal wastes, degrading creatine that is made in the kidney, liver, and pancreas and excreted through urine. Animal tissues use creatine to buffer the charging of high-energy carriers during rapid ADP to ATP conversion, which creates 1-methylhydantoin. To avoid build up, animals excrete creatine and creatinine in urine.

In humans, creatinase is used in enzymatic measurements of creatinine concentration for the diagnosis of renal and muscle diseases. The enzyme catalyzes the second step of a coupled creatine assay, which is used to monitor the filtration rate of the glomeruli of the kidneys.

== Energetics and kinetics ==
Activity parameters pertaining to energetics and kinetics of the enzyme are as described below. The parameters were described through classic steady-state enzyme assays.

Activity Parameters
| Parameter | Value | Notes |
|---|---|---|
| K_{m} (creatine) | 1.33 mM | Moderate affinity |
| K_{cat} (creatine) | 0.246 s^{−1} | Slow turnover rate |
| Activation energy | 43 kJ/mol | Low-moderate |
| Specific activity | 15 U/mg | Low |
| Optimum pH | 8 | Stable between 6-8 |
| Optimum temperature | 30 °C | 30 min half-life at 45 °C |
