= 4-Oxalocrotonate tautomerase =

4-oxalocrotonate tautomerase
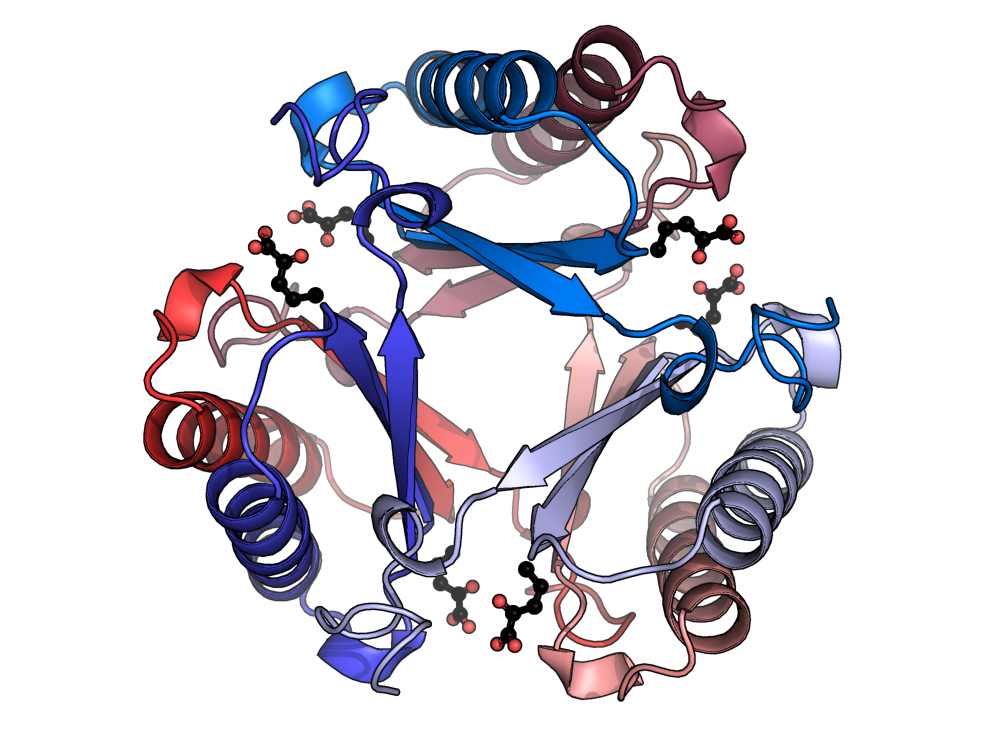
- Pseudomonas putida 4-oxalocrotonate tautomerase hexamer bound to 2-oxo-3-pentenoic acid. PDB: 1BJP

Identifiers
- Symbol: Taut
- Pfam: PF01361
- InterPro: IPR004370
- CDD: cd00491
Available protein structures:
- Pfam: structures / ECOD
- PDB: RCSB PDB; PDBe; PDBj
- PDBsum: structure summary
- PDB: PDB: 1bjp PDB: 1gyj PDB: 1gyx PDB: 1gyy PDB: 1otf PDB: 1s0y PDB: 4ota PDB: 4otb PDB: 4otc

4-Oxalocrotonate tautomerase (EC 5.3.2.6) or 4-OT is an enzyme that converts 2-hydroxymuconate to the αβ-unsaturated ketone, 2-oxo-3-hexenedioate. This enzyme forms part of a bacterial metabolic pathway that oxidatively catabolizes toluene, o-xylene, 3-ethyltoluene, and 1,2,4-trimethylbenzene into intermediates of the citric acid cycle. With a monomer size of just 62 amino acid residues, the 4-Oxalocrotonate tautomerase is one of the smallest enzyme subunits known. However, in solution, the enzyme forms a hexamer of six identical subunits, so the active site may be formed by amino acid residues from several subunits. This enzyme is also unusual in that it uses a proline residue at the amino terminus as an active site residue.

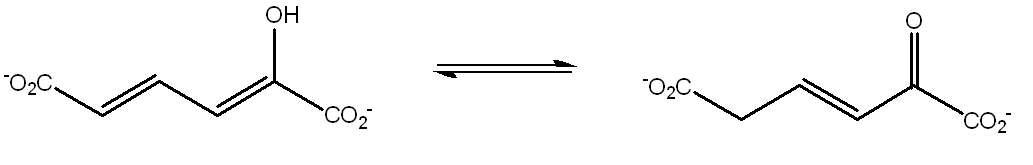
Reaction catalyzed by 4-oxalocrotonate tautomerase.
