= Enzyme repressor =

An enzyme repressor is a type of regulatory protein that controls the activity of enzymes, typically by binding to specific sites on DNA or directly to the enzyme itself. These repressors play a crucial role in cellular processes, particularly in gene expression and metabolic pathways, by inhibiting the synthesis or activity of enzymes involved in these processes.

== Mechanism of action ==
Enzyme repressors can function through several mechanisms:

- Gene regulation: In bacterial and eukaryotic cells, enzyme repressors often bind to operator regions on DNA, preventing the transcription of specific genes. This process is a fundamental component of transcriptional regulation, wherein the repressor protein blocks the binding of RNA polymerase to the promoter, halting gene expression.
- Feedback inhibition: In metabolic pathways, enzyme repressors can act through feedback inhibition. In this mechanism, the end product of a biochemical pathway acts as a repressor, binding to the enzyme and reducing its activity. This feedback mechanism helps maintain homeostasis within the cell by regulating the concentration of metabolites.
- Direct binding: Some repressors inhibit enzymes by binding directly to the enzyme, altering its conformation and thus reducing its catalytic activity. This is seen in various allosteric regulation processes.

== Examples ==
- Lac repressor (LacI): In Escherichia coli, the Lac repressor protein binds to the operator region of the lac operon, inhibiting the transcription of genes involved in lactose metabolism when lactose is absent.
- Repressor proteins in eukaryotes: In eukaryotic cells, various repressor proteins are involved in the regulation of enzymes involved in cellular processes such as DNA replication and cell cycle control.
- Histone deacetylase 1 (HDAC1): In eukaryotic cells, HDAC1 functions as a transcriptional repressor by removing acetyl groups from histones, leading to chromatin condensation and reduced gene expression.

== Importance ==
Enzyme repressors are critical in maintaining cellular efficiency by preventing the overproduction of enzymes or metabolites. They also play a role in cellular response to environmental changes and stress, such as nutrient availability or changes in temperature, ensuring that cells only produce necessary enzymes under optimal conditions.

== See also ==
- Enzyme activator
- Enzyme inhibitor
- Regulation of gene expression
