= Zymase =

Enzyme complex

Zymase (also known as alcoholase) is an obsolete term for an enzyme complex that catalyzes the fermentation of sugar into ethanol and carbon dioxide. It occurs naturally in yeasts. Zymase activity varies among yeast strains.

Zymase is also the brand name of the drug pancrelipase.

== Cell-free fermentation experiment ==
Zymase was first isolated from the yeast cell in 1897 by a German chemist named Eduard Buchner who fermented sugar in the laboratory without living cells, leading to the 1907 Nobel Prize in Chemistry.

The experiment for which Buchner won the Nobel Prize consisted of producing a cell-free extract of yeast cells and showing that this "press juice" could ferment sugar. This dealt yet another blow to vitalism by showing that the presence of living yeast cells was not needed for fermentation. The cell-free extract was produced by combining dry yeast cells, quartz and diatomaceous earth and then pulverizing the yeast cells with a mortar and pestle. This mixture would then become moist as the yeast cells' contents would come out of the cells. Once this step was done, the moist mixture would be put through a press and when this resulting "press juice" had glucose, fructose, or maltose added, carbon dioxide was seen to evolve, sometimes for days. Microscopic investigation revealed no living yeast cells in the extract.

Buchner hypothesized that yeast cells secrete proteins into their environment in order to ferment sugars. It was later shown that fermentation occurs inside the yeast cells.

British chemist Sir Arthur Harden divided zymase into two varieties (dialyzable and nondialyzable) in 1905.

Some science historians suggest that Eduard Buchner, in his 1897 work, merely repeated experiments already made by Antoine Béchamp in 1857. This is not the case: what Buchner obtained with yeast zymase, and without yeast cells, was alcoholic fermentation, while Béchamp had explicitly stated that, in absence of yeast cells, and by use of what he, also, called "zymase", he obtained only sugar inversion and no alcoholic fermentation. According to K.L. Manchester, what Béchamp called "zymase" was invertase.
