= Enzyme activator =

Molecules which increase enzyme activity

Enzyme activators are molecules that bind to enzymes and increase their activity. They are the opposite of enzyme inhibitors. These molecules are often involved in the allosteric regulation of enzymes in the control of metabolism. In some cases, when a substrate binds to one catalytic subunit of an enzyme, this can trigger an increase in the substrate affinity as well as catalytic activity in the enzyme's other subunits, and thus the substrate acts as an activator.

== Examples ==
=== Phosphofructokinase 1 ===
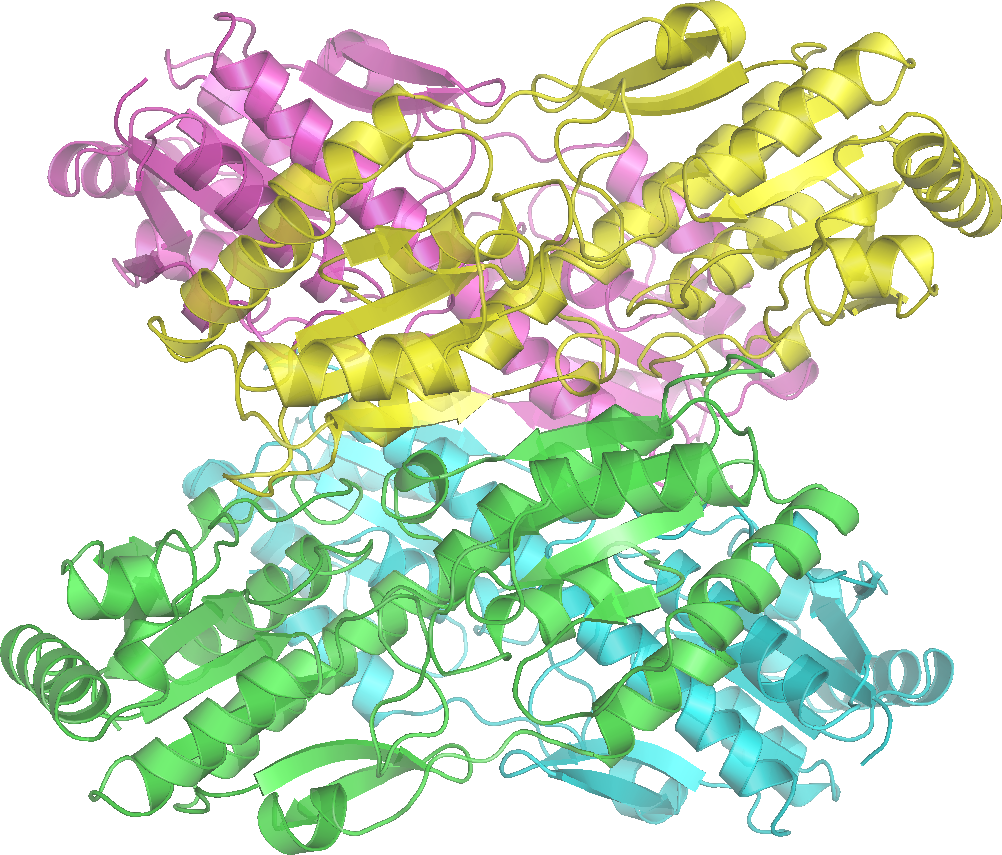
Bacillus stearothermophilus phosphofructokinase. PDB: 6PFK.

An example of an enzyme activator working in this way is fructose 2,6-bisphosphate, which activates phosphofructokinase 1 and increases the rate of glycolysis in response to the hormone glucagon.

=== Hexokinase-I ===
Hexokinase-I (HK-I) is an enzyme activator because it draws glucose into the glycolysis pathway. Its function is to phosphorylate glucose releasing glucose-6-phosphate (G6P) as the product. HK-I not only signals the activation of glucose into glycolysis but also maintains a low glucose concentration to facilitate glucose diffusion into the cell. It has two catalytic domains (N-terminal domain and C-terminal domain) which are connected through an α-helix. The N-terminal acts as an allosteric regulator of C-terminal; the C-terminal is the only one involved in the catalytic activity. HK-I is regulated by the concentration of G6P, where G6P acts as a feedback inhibitor. At low G6P concentration, HK-I is activated; at high G6P concentration, the HK-I is inhibited.

=== Glucokinase ===
Glucokinase (GK) is an enzyme that helps in the glycolytic pathway by phosphorylating glucose into glucose-6-phosphate (G6P). It is an isozyme of hexokinase and is found mainly in pancreatic β cells, but also liver, gut, and brain cells where glycolysis cause glucose-induced insulin secretion. Glucokinase activator lowers blood glucose concentrations by enhancing glucose uptake in the liver and increasing insulin production by the pancreatic β cells. Due to this, Glucokinase and glucokinase activators are the focus of treatment for those with type 2 diabetes mellitus. Glucokinase have a single allosteric site where the glucose-regulating protein (GKRP) binds in the nucleus of the cell in its inactive form when there is a low concentration of glucose present in the cell. However, when the glucose concentration of the cell increases the glucokinase-GKRP complex breaks apart and GK proceeds to the cytoplasm where it then phosphorylates glucose. Glucose when abundant in cells acts as an enzyme activator for glucokinase. Glucokinase activation in the β cells and liver cells results in the uptake of glucose and production of glycogen. This activation in the β cells leads to insulin secretion, promoting glucose uptake storing it as glycogen in the muscles.

== See also ==
- Enzyme inducer
- Effector (biology)
