= Encopresis =

Fecal incontinence in children

- Other names: Paradoxical diarrhea
- Specialty: Psychiatry, clinical psychology, pediatrics

Encopresis (from Ancient Greek ἐγκόπρησις, enkóprēsis) is repeated passage of stool in inappropriate places by a child who is developmentally expected to be toilet trained. The term is most commonly used to describe fecal soiling associated with chronic constipation and overflow incontinence, though it may also refer to non-retentive fecal soiling without constipation. In psychiatric classification systems such as the DSM-5, encopresis is categorized as an elimination disorder.

This term is usually applied to children, and where the symptom is present in adults, it is more commonly known as fecal incontinence (including fecal soiling, fecal leakage or fecal seepage).

== Signs and symptoms ==
(In)voluntary soiling of undergarments. Encopresis may be classified as retentive (associated with constipation and overflow incontinence) or non-retentive (without constipation and overflow incontinence). Those with constipation may experience decreased appetite, abdominal pain, have pain on defecation, have fewer bowel movements, and have abnormally hard or soft stools. Those without constipation do not have these symptoms.

== Causes ==
Encopresis is commonly caused by constipation in children, by reflexive withholding of stool, by various physiological, psychological, or neurological disorders, or from surgery (a somewhat rare occurrence). Encopresis can also occur without constipation.

The colon normally removes excess water from feces. If the feces or stool remains in the colon too long due to conditioned withholding or incidental constipation, so much water is removed that the stool becomes hard, and becomes painful for the child to expel in an ordinary bowel movement. A vicious cycle can develop, where the child may avoid moving their bowels in order to avoid the "expected" painful toilet episode. This cycle can result in so deeply conditioning the holding response that the rectal anal inhibitory response (RAIR) or anismus results. The RAIR has been shown to occur even under anesthesia and when voluntary control is lost. The hardened stool continues to build up and stretches the colon or rectum to the point where the normal sensations associated with impending bowel movements do not occur. Eventually, softer stool can leak around the blockage and cannot be withheld by the anus, resulting in soiling. The child typically has no control over these leakage accidents, and may not be able to feel that they have occurred or are about to occur due to the loss of sensation in the rectum and the RAIR. Chronic soiling accidents may cause distress, embarrassment, and social difficulties for affected children and their families, which can complicate treatment adherence.

The onset of encopresis is most often benign. The usual onset is associated with toilet training, demands that the child sit for long periods of time, and intense negative parental reactions to feces. Beginning school or preschool is another major environmental trigger with shared bathrooms. Feuding parents, siblings, moving, and divorce can also inhibit toileting behaviors and promote constipation. An initiating cause may become less relevant as chronic stimuli predominate.

== Diagnosis ==
The psychiatric (DSM-5) diagnostic criteria for encopresis are:

1. Repeated passage of feces into inappropriate places (e.g., underwear or floor) whether voluntary or unintentional
2. At least one such event a month for at least 3 months
3. Chronological age of at least 4 years (or equivalent developmental level)
4. The behavior is not exclusively due to a physiological effect of a substance (e.g., laxatives) or a general medical condition, except through a mechanism involving constipation.

The DSM-5 recognizes two subtypes: with constipation and overflow incontinence (retentive encopresis), and without constipation and overflow incontinence (non retentive encopresis). In the subtype with constipation, the feces are usually poorly formed and leakage is continuous, and this occurs both during sleep and waking hours. In the type without constipation, the feces are usually well-formed, soiling is intermittent, and feces are usually deposited in a prominent location. This form may be associated with oppositional defiant disorder (ODD) or conduct disorder, or other behavioral and developmental conditions.

== Treatment ==
According to clinical guidelines, pediatricians often recommend the following three-pronged approach to the treatment of encopresis associated with constipation:

1. Cleaning out
2. Using stool-softening agents
3. Scheduled sitting times, typically after meals

The initial clean-out is achieved with enemas, laxatives, or both. The predominant approach today is the use of oral stool softeners like Movicol, Miralax, lactulose, mineral oil, etc. Following that, enemas and laxatives are used daily to keep the stools soft and allow the stretched bowel to return to its normal size.

Behavioral treatment focuses on establishing a regular toileting routine. Children are typically asked to sit on the toilet for 5–15 minutes at consistent times each day, usually shortly after meals, to take advantage of the gastrocolic reflex, which increases colonic motility after eating and makes defecation more likely. Over time, consistent successful toileting helps reestablish normal rectal sensation and voluntary defecation reflexes that may have been disrupted by chronic stool withholding and rectal distension.

Alternatively, when this method fails for six months or longer, a more aggressive approach may be undertaken using suppositories and enemas in a carefully programmed way to overcome the reflexive holding response and to allow the proper voiding reflex to take over. Failure to establish a normal bowel habit can result in permanent stretching of the colon. Certainly, allowing this problem to continue for years with constant assurances that the child "will grow out of it" should be avoided.

Dietary changes are an important part of managing encopresis caused by constipation. Management typically involves increasing dietary fiber by eating more bran, whole grains, fruits, and vegetables, along with drinking more water and fluids. While juices can help increase liquid intake, excess sweetened juice is generally limited due to the risk of tooth decay. Diet adjustments also focus on reducing foods that can contribute to constipation, such as dairy, peanuts, cooked carrots, and bananas, as well as avoiding caffeinated drinks like cola and tea. Overall, the emphasis is on providing well-balanced meals and snacks while limiting fast foods that are high in fats and sugars.

The standard behavioral treatment for functional encopresis, which has been shown to be highly effective, is a motivational system such as a contingency management system. In addition to this basic component, seven or eight other behavioral treatment components can be added to increase effectiveness.

== Epidemiology ==
The estimated prevalence of encopresis in four-year-olds is between one and three percent. The disorder is thought to be more common in males than females, by a factor of 3:1 to 6:1.
