= Oxyphenisatine =

- Kekulé, skeletal formula of oxyphenisatine

Names
- Preferred IUPAC name 3,3-Bis(4-hydroxyphenyl)-1,3-dihydro-2H-indol-2-one
- Other names Dihydroxydiphenylisatin; Diphenolisatin; Oxyphenisatin

Identifiers
CAS Number	125-13-3
3D model (JSmol)	Interactive image; Interactive image
ChEMBL	ChEMBL245807
ChemSpider	29053
DrugBank	DB04823
ECHA InfoCard	100.004.299
EC Number	204-728-1
KEGG	D08326
PubChem CID	31315
UNII	3BT0VQG2GQ
CompTox Dashboard (EPA)	DTXSID5044528
- InChI: InChI=1S/C20H15NO3/c22-15-9-5-13(6-10-15)20(14-7-11-16(23)12-8-14)17-3-1-2-4-18(17)21-19(20)24/h1-12,22-23H,(H,21,24) Key: SJDACOMXKWHBOW-UHFFFAOYSA-N; InChI=1/C20H15NO3/c22-15-9-5-13(6-10-15)20(14-7-11-16(23)12-8-14)17-3-1-2-4-18(17)21-19(20)24/h1-12,22-23H,(H,21,24) Key: SJDACOMXKWHBOW-UHFFFAOYAU
- SMILES: Oc1ccc(cc1)C1(C(=O)Nc2ccccc12)c1ccc(O)cc1; OC1=CC=C(C=C1)C1(C(=O)NC2=C1C=CC=C2)C1=CC=C(O)C=C1

Properties
Chemical formula	C_{20}H_{15}NO_{3}
Molar mass	317.344 g·mol^{−1}
log P	1.398
Acidity (pK_{a})	9.423
Basicity (pK_{b})	4.574

Pharmacology
ATC code	A06AB01 (WHO)
Routes of administration	Oral, rectal
Legal status	Withdrawn
- Except where otherwise noted, data are given for materials in their standard state (at 25 °C [77 °F], 100 kPa). verify (what is ?) Infobox references

Oxyphenisatine (or oxyphenisatin) is a laxative. It is closely related to bisacodyl, sodium picosulfate, and phenolphthalein. Long-term use is associated with liver damage, and as a result, it was withdrawn in most countries in the early 1970s. The acetate derivative oxyphenisatine acetate was also once used as a laxative.

Natural chemical compounds similar to oxyphenisatine may be present in prunes, but a recent review of the relevant scientific literature suggests that the laxative effect of prunes is due to other constituents including phenolic compounds (mainly neochlorogenic acids and chlorogenic acids) and sorbitol. Oxyphenisatin has cathartic properties.

== Synthesis ==
The ketone group of isatin (1) is nonenolizable and has interesting properties. In strong acid it becomes protonated, and the oxygen can be replaced by electron rich moieties.

Oxyphenisatin synthesis:

In 1885, it was reported that condensation of isatin with phenol 2 leads to oxyphenisatin (3), which can then also be acetylated to (4).

== Derivatives ==
1. Phenisatin (Triacetyldiphenolisatin, Laxagetten, Unilax, Trisatin)
2. Nicoxyphenisatin
3. Cinnoxyphenisatin
4. Cofisatine [54063-34-2]
