= Prucalopride =

Drug used to treat chronic constipation

Clinical data
- Trade names: Resolor, Resotran, Motegrity
- Other names: R-093877, R-108512
- AHFS/Drugs.com: Monograph
- MedlinePlus: a619011
- License data: US DailyMed: Prucalopride
- Pregnancy category: AU: B1
- Routes of administration: By mouth
- ATC code: A06AX05 (WHO)

Legal status
- Legal status: AU: S4 (Prescription only); UK: POM (Prescription only); US: ℞-only; EU: Rx-only; In general: ℞ (Prescription only)

Identifiers
- IUPAC name: 4-Amino-5-chloro-N-[1-(3-methoxypropyl)piperidin-4-yl]-2,3-dihydro-1-benzofuran-7-carboxamide
- CAS Number: 179474-81-8; as salt: 179474-85-2
- PubChem CID: 3052762
- IUPHAR/BPS: 243
- DrugBank: DB06480; as salt: DBSALT002626
- ChemSpider: 2314539; as salt: 8045700
- UNII: 0A09IUW5TP; as salt: 4V2G75E1CK
- KEGG: D09205; as salt: D10152
- ChEBI: CHEBI:135552
- ChEMBL: ChEMBL117287; as salt: ChEMBL2105748
- CompTox Dashboard (EPA): DTXSID5057670

Chemical and physical data
- Formula: C_{18}H_{26}ClN_{3}O_{3}
- Molar mass: 367.87 g·mol^{−1}
- 3D model (JSmol): Interactive image
- SMILES: COCCCN1CCC(CC1)NC(=O)C2=CC(=C(C3=C2OCC3)N)Cl
- InChI: InChI=1S/C18H26ClN3O3/c1-24-9-2-6-22-7-3-12(4-8-22)21-18(23)14-11-15(19)16(20)13-5-10-25-17(13)14/h11-12H,2-10,20H2,1H3,(H,21,23); Key:ZPMNHBXQOOVQJL-UHFFFAOYSA-N

Prucalopride, sold under brand names Resolor and Motegrity among others, is a medication acting as a selective, high affinity 5-HT_{4} receptor agonist which targets the impaired motility associated with chronic constipation, thus normalizing bowel movements. Prucalopride was approved for medical use in the European Union in 2009, in Canada in 2011, and in the United States in December 2018.

== Medical uses ==
The primary measure of efficacy in the clinical trials is three or more spontaneous complete bowel movements per week; a secondary measure is an increase of at least one complete spontaneous bowel movement per week. Further measures are improvements in PAC-QOL (a quality of life measure) and PAC-SYM (a range of stool, abdominal, and rectal symptoms associated with chronic constipation). Infrequent bowel movements, bloating, straining, abdominal pain, and defecation urge with inability to evacuate can be severe symptoms, significantly affecting quality of life.

In three large clinical trials, 12 weeks of treatment with prucalopride 2 and 4 mg/day resulted in a significantly higher proportion of patients reaching the primary efficacy endpoint of an average of ≥3 spontaneous complete bowel movements than with placebo. There was also significantly improved bowel habit and associated symptoms, patient satisfaction with bowel habit and treatment, and HR-QOL in patients with severe chronic constipation, including those who did not experience adequate relief with prior therapies (>80% of the trial participants). The improvement in patient satisfaction with bowel habit and treatment was maintained during treatment for up to 24 months; prucalopride therapy was generally well tolerated.

Small clinical trials suggested that prucalopride administration results in the 5-HT_{4} receptor agonism-associated memory enhancing in healthy participants improving their ability to recall and increasing neural activation in the hippocampus and functionally related areas.

== Contraindications ==
Prucalopride is contraindicated where there is hypersensitivity to the active substance or to any of the excipients, renal impairment requiring dialysis, intestinal perforation or obstruction due to structural or functional disorder of the gut wall, obstructive ileus, severe inflammatory conditions of the intestinal tract, such as Crohn's disease, and ulcerative colitis and toxic megacolon/megarectum.

== Side effects ==
Prucalopride has been given orally to ~2700 patients with chronic constipation in controlled clinical trials. The most frequently reported side effects are headache and gastrointestinal symptoms (abdominal pain, nausea or diarrhea) and suicidal ideation. Such reactions occur predominantly at the start of therapy and usually disappear within a few days with continued treatment.

== Mechanism of action ==
Prucalopride, a first in class dihydro-benzofuran-carboxamide, is a selective, high affinity serotonin (5-HT_{4}) receptor agonist with enterokinetic activities.

The observed effects are exerted via highly selective action on 5-HT_{4} receptors: prucalopride has >150-fold higher affinity for 5-HT_{4} receptors than for other receptors. Prucalopride differs from other 5-HT_{4} agonists such as tegaserod and cisapride, which at therapeutic concentrations also interact with other receptors (5-HT_{1B/D} and the cardiac human ether-a-go-go K^{+} or hERG channel respectively) and this may account for the adverse cardiovascular events that have resulted in the restricted availability of these drugs. Clinical trials evaluating the effect of prucalopride on QT interval and related adverse events have not demonstrated significant differences compared with placebo.

== Pharmacokinetics ==
Prucalopride is rapidly absorbed (C_{max} attained 2–3 hours after single 2 mg oral dose) and is extensively distributed. Metabolism is not the major route of elimination. In vitro, human liver metabolism is very slow and only minor amounts of metabolites are found. A large fraction of the active substance is excreted unchanged (about 60% of the administered dose in urine and at least 6% in feces). Renal excretion of unchanged prucalopride involves both passive filtration and active secretion. Plasma clearance averages 317 ml/min, terminal half-life is 24–30 hours, and steady-state is reached within 3–4 days. On once daily treatment with 2 mg prucalopride, steady-state plasma concentrations fluctuate between trough and peak values of 2.5 and 7 ng/ml, respectively.

In vitro data indicate that prucalopride has a low interaction potential, and therapeutic concentrations of prucalopride are not expected to affect the CYP-mediated metabolism of co-medicated medicinal products.

== Society and culture ==
=== Legal status ===
In the European Economic Area, prucalopride was originally authorized for the symptomatic treatment of chronic constipation in women in whom laxatives fail to provide adequate relief. Subsequently, it has been authorized by the European Commission for use in all adults for the same indication.
