= Gastroileal reflex =

Extrinsic reflex of the gastrointestinal tract

The gastroileal reflex is one of the three extrinsic reflexes of the gastrointestinal tract, the other two being the gastrocolic reflex and the enterogastric reflex. The gastroileal reflex is stimulated by the presence of food in the stomach and gastric peristalsis. Initiation of the reflex causes peristalsis in the ileum and the opening of the ileocecal valve (which allows the emptying of the ileal contents into the large intestine, or colon). This in turn stimulates colonic peristalsis and an urge to defecate.
