= C20H15NO4 =

The molecular formula C_{20}H_{15}NO_{4} (molar mass: 333.34 g/mol, exact mass: 333.1001 u) may refer to:

- Bisoxatin
- Dihydrosanguinarine
