= Enterogastric reflex =

Reflex inhibiting stomach emptying

The enterogastric reflex is one of the three extrinsic reflexes of the gastrointestinal tract, the other two being the gastroileal reflex and the gastrocolic reflex. The enterogastric reflex is stimulated by duodenal distension. It can also be stimulated by a pH of 3-4 in the duodenum and by a pH of 1.5 in the stomach. Upon initiation of the reflex, the release of gastrin by G-cells in the antrum of the stomach is shut off. This in turn inhibits gastric motility and the secretion of gastric acid (HCl).

== Emptying inhibitory factors ==
The stomach's contents are inhibited from emptying into the small intestine by:

- duodenal distension
- duodenal acidic pH
- duodenal hypertonicity
- increased osmolarity of gastric chyme
- sympathetic stimulation
- intense pain
- Cholecystokinin, Secretin, Vasoactive intestinal peptide
- Nitric oxide, somatostatin from D cells

== Emptying stimulatory factors ==
The stomach's contents empty through the pylorus, allowing digestion to proceed, when there is:

- parasympathetic stimulation
- increased volume and fluidity of gastric contents
