= Senna glycoside =

Constipation and surgery medication

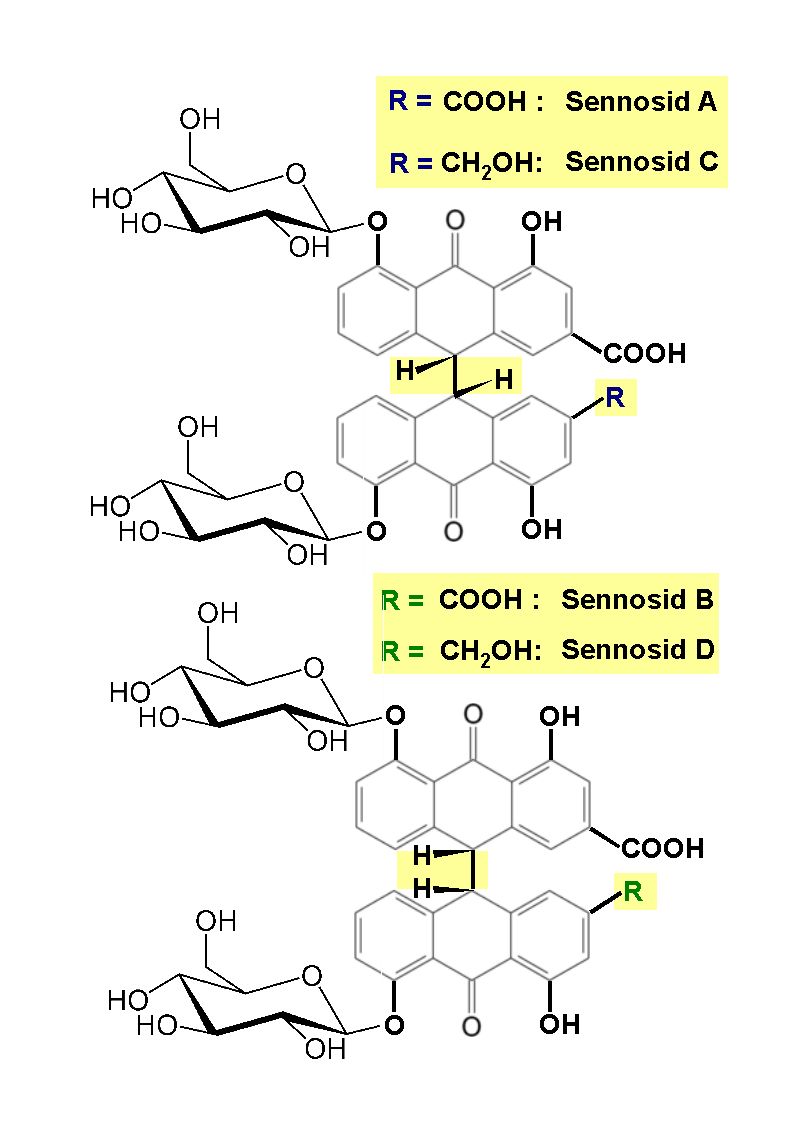

Clinical data
- Trade names: Ex-Lax, Senokot, others
- AHFS/Drugs.com: Monograph
- MedlinePlus: a601112
- License data: US DailyMed: Senna
- Pregnancy category: AU: A
- Routes of administration: Oral, rectal
- ATC code: A06AB06 (WHO)

Legal status
- Legal status: UK: P (Pharmacy medicines); US: OTC; In general: Over-the-counter (OTC)

Pharmacokinetic data
- Onset of action: Minutes (by rectum), 6 to 12 hours (orally)

Identifiers
- IUPAC name: 9-[2-carboxy-4-hydroxy-10-oxo-5-[3,4,5-trihydroxy-6-(hydroxymethyl)oxan-2-yl]oxy-9H-anthracen-9-yl]-4-hydroxy-10-oxo-5-[3,4,5-trihydroxy-6-(hydroxymethyl)oxan-2-yl]oxy-9H-anthracene-2-carboxylic acid
- CAS Number: 66575-30-2
- PubChem CID: 5199
- DrugBank: DB11365
- ChemSpider: 65892
- KEGG: D02171

Chemical and physical data
- Formula: C_{42}H_{38}O_{20}
- Molar mass: 862.746 g·mol^{−1}

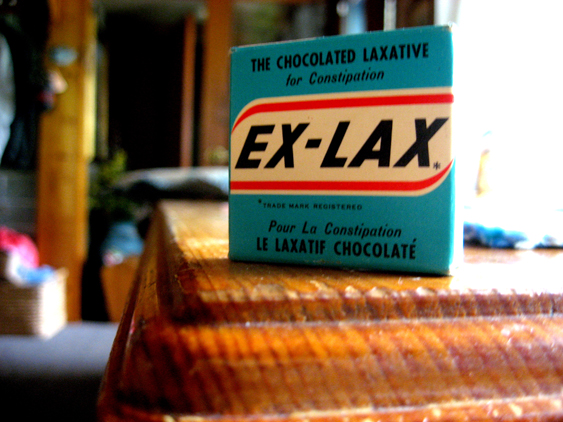
Picture depicting an old Ex-Lax™ carton

Senna glycoside, also known as sennoside or senna, is a stimulant-laxative medication used to treat constipation and empty the large intestine. It is typically given for acute constipation, in preparation for bowel surgery or exam, or for prevention of constipation in those taking opiates long term. The medication is taken orally (swallowed by mouth) or given by suppository via the rectum. It typically begins working in around 30 minutes when given by rectum and within six to twelve hours when given orally. It is a weaker laxative than bisacodyl and castor oil.

Common side effects of senna glycoside include nausea, vomiting, abdominal cramps, diarrhea, and flatulence. While no harm has been found to result from use while breastfeeding, such use is not typically recommended. It is not typically recommended in children. Senna may change urine to a pink-red or brown-black color. Senna derivatives are a type of stimulant laxative and are of the anthraquinone type. While its mechanism of action is not entirely clear, senna is thought to act by increasing fluid secretion within and contraction of the large intestine.

Sennosides come from the group of plants Senna. In plant form, it has been used at least since the 700s AD. It is on the World Health Organization's List of Essential Medicines. It is available as a generic medication. In 2023, it was the 302nd most commonly prescribed medication in the United States, with more than 300,000 prescriptions. In 2023, the combination with docusate was the 242nd most commonly prescribed medication in the United States, with more than 1 million prescriptions. It is sold under a number of brand names including Ex-Lax and Senokot.

== Medical uses ==
Senna is used for episodic and chronic constipation, though there is a lack of high-quality evidence to support its use for these purposes.

It may also be used to aid in the evacuation of the bowel prior to surgery or invasive rectal or colonic examinations.

=== Administration ===
Oral senna products typically produce a bowel movement in 6 to 12 hours. Rectal suppositories can act within minutes or take up to two hours.

== Contraindications ==
According to Commission E, senna is contraindicated in cases of intestinal obstruction, acute intestinal inflammation (e.g., Crohn's disease), ulcerative colitis, appendicitis, and abdominal pain of unknown origin.

Senna is considered contraindicated in people with a documented allergy to anthraquinones. Such allergies are rare and typically limited to dermatological reactions of redness and itching.

== Adverse effects ==
Adverse effects are typically limited to gastrointestinal reactions and include abdominal pain or cramps, diarrhea, nausea, and vomiting.

Evidence no longer supports traditional concerns that longterm senna use damages the colon, causes dependence, or leads to tolerance, though high-quality longterm human data are lacking for this reassurance. Such concerns originated mostly from early studies in patients with severe constipation who likely had pre-existing enteric neuromuscular abnormalities, not laxative-induced damage.

Regular use of senna products can lead to a characteristic brown pigmentation of the internal colonic wall seen on colonoscopy. This abnormal pigmentation is known as melanosis coli.

=== Interactions ===
Senna glycosides can increase digoxin toxicity in patients taking digoxin by reducing serum potassium levels, thereby enhancing the effects of digoxin.

== Mechanism of action ==
Sennosides increase fluid and electrolytes in the large bowel and also stimulate peristalsis by action on Auerbach's plexus.

== Pharmacology ==
They are anthraquinones derivatives and dimeric glycosides.

== Society and culture ==
=== Formulations ===
Senna is an over-the-counter drug available in multiple formulations, including oral formations (liquid, tablet, granular) and rectal suppositories. Senna products are manufactured by multiple generic drug makers and sold under various brand names.

=== Brand names ===
Ex-Lax, Geri-kot, Perdiem Overnight Relief, Senexon, Pursennid, Senna Smooth, Senna-Gen, Senna-GRX, Senna-Lax, Senna-Tabs, Senna-Time, SennaCon, Senno, Senokot.
