= Bisoxatin =

Chemical compound

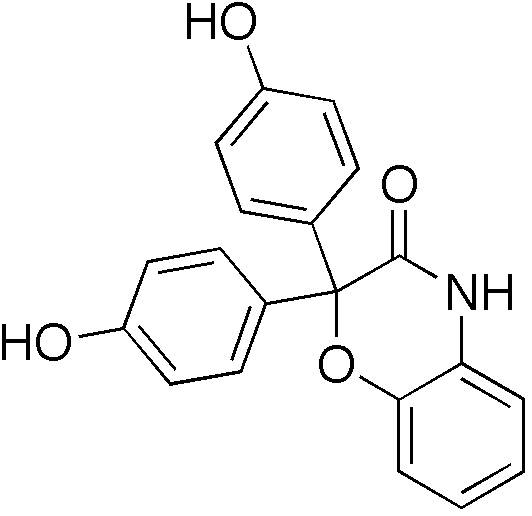

Clinical data
- AHFS/Drugs.com: International Drug Names
- ATC code: A06AB09 (WHO)

Identifiers
- IUPAC name: 2,2-bis(4-hydroxyphenyl)-2H-benzo[b][1,4]oxazin-3(4H)-one
- CAS Number: 17692-24-9
- PubChem CID: 28689
- ChemSpider: 26684
- UNII: 7C75N0L7FP
- ChEMBL: ChEMBL2106004
- CompTox Dashboard (EPA): DTXSID00170217
- ECHA InfoCard: 100.037.876

Chemical and physical data
- Formula: C_{20}H_{15}NO_{4}
- Molar mass: 333.343 g·mol^{−1}
- 3D model (JSmol): Interactive image
- SMILES: O=C1Nc4c(OC1(c2ccc(O)cc2)c3ccc(O)cc3)cccc4
- InChI: InChI=1S/C20H15NO4/c22-15-9-5-13(6-10-15)20(14-7-11-16(23)12-8-14)19(24)21-17-3-1-2-4-18(17)25-20/h1-12,22-23H,(H,21,24); Key:BPKUDUSVDVLOPY-UHFFFAOYSA-N

Bisoxatin (formula: C_{20}H_{15}NO_{4}) is a laxative. It can be synthesized from isatin.
