= Sodium picosulfate =

Chemical compound

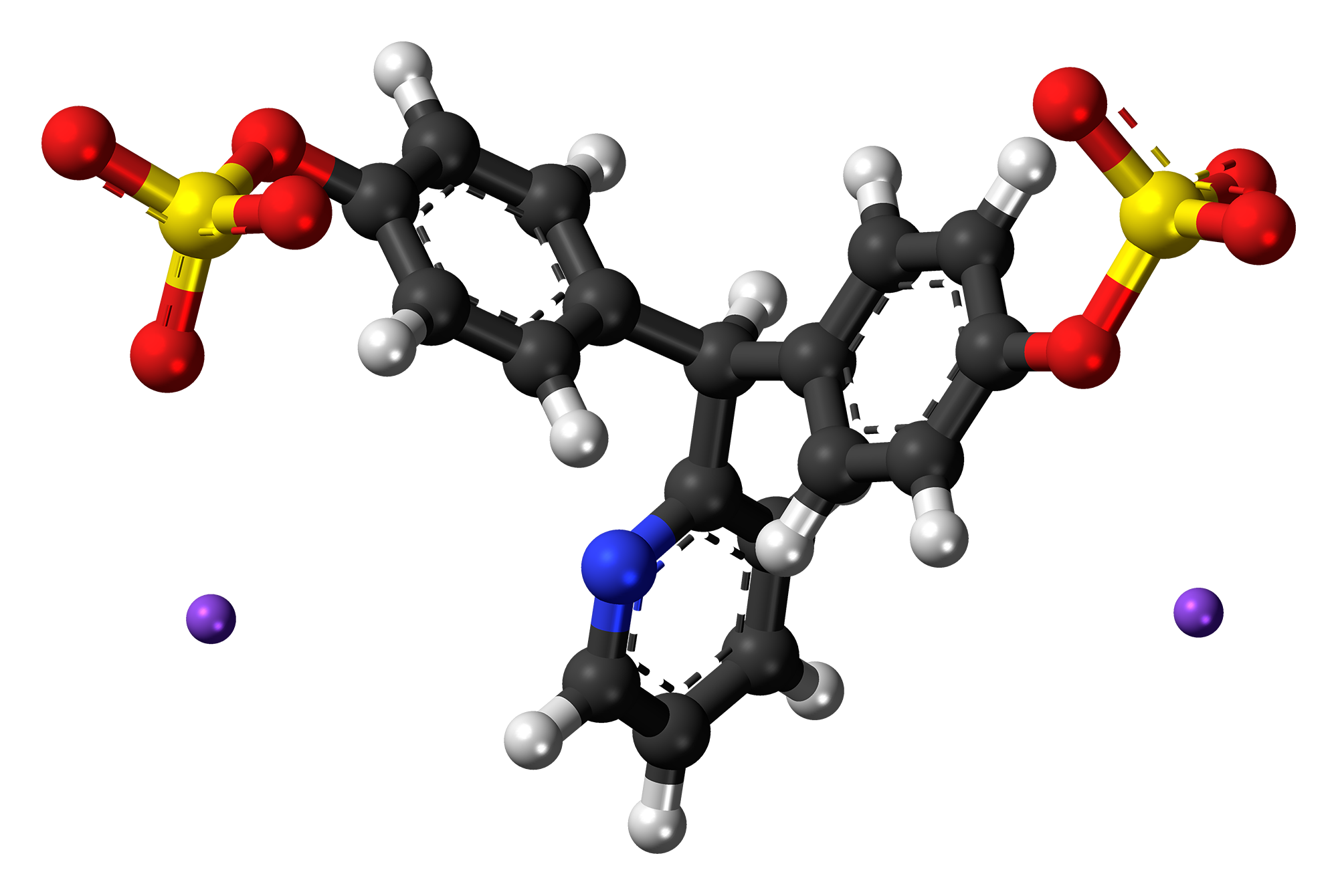

Clinical data
- Other names: Picosulfuric acid
- AHFS/Drugs.com: International Drug Names
- License data: US DailyMed: Sodium picosulfate
- Routes of administration: By mouth
- ATC code: monohydrate: A06AB08 (WHO) A06AB58 (WHO) (combinations)

Legal status
- Legal status: US: ℞-only as part of Clenpiq

Identifiers
- IUPAC name: disodium (pyridin-2-ylmethylene)di-4,1-phenylene disulfate
- CAS Number: monohydrate: 1307301-38-7; anhydrous: 10040-45-6
- PubChem CID: monohydrate: 5282431; anhydrous: 68654
- DrugBank: monohydrate: DBSALT001830; anhydrous: DBSALT001831
- ChemSpider: monohydrate: 4445585; anhydrous: 61910
- UNII: monohydrate: LR57574HN8; anhydrous: VW106606Y8
- KEGG: monohydrate: DG00072
- ChEBI: anhydrous: CHEBI:32147
- ChEMBL: monohydrate: ChEMBL1741134; anhydrous: ChEMBL1697768
- CompTox Dashboard (EPA): monohydrate: DTXSID7048663
- ECHA InfoCard: 100.030.097

Chemical and physical data
- Formula: C_{18}H_{15}NNa_{2}O_{9}S_{2}
- Molar mass: 499.42 g·mol^{−1}
- 3D model (JSmol): monohydrate: Interactive image; anhydrous: Interactive image
- SMILES: monohydrate: O.[Na+].[Na+].[O-]S(=O)(=O)OC1=CC=C(C=C1)C(C1=CC=C(OS([O-])(=O)=O)C=C1)C1=CC=CC=N1; anhydrous: [Na+].[Na+].[O-]S(=O)(=O)OC1=CC=C(C=C1)C(C1=CC=C(OS([O-])(=O)=O)C=C1)C1=CC=CC=N1
- InChI: monohydrate: InChI=1S/C18H15NO8S2.2Na.H2O/c20-28(21,22)26-15-8-4-13(5-9-15)18(17-3-1-2-12-19-17)14-6-10-16(11-7-14)27-29(23,24)25;;;/h1-12,18H,(H,20,21,22)(H,23,24,25);;;1H2/q;2*+1;/p-2; Key:FHYUVJHZGPGDSP-UHFFFAOYSA-L; anhydrous: InChI=1S/C18H15NO8S2.2Na/c20-28(21,22)26-15-8-4-13(5-9-15)18(17-3-1-2-12-19-17)14-6-10-16(11-7-14)27-29(23,24)25;;/h1-12,18H,(H,20,21,22)(H,23,24,25);;/q;2*+1/p-2; Key:GOZDTZWAMGHLDY-UHFFFAOYSA-L

Sodium picosulfate (INN, also known as sodium picosulphate) is a contact stimulant laxative used as a treatment for constipation or to prepare the large bowel before colonoscopy or surgery.

It is available as a generic medication.

== Medical uses ==
Sodium picosulfate used in combination with magnesium oxide and anhydrous citric acid is indicated for cleansing of the colon as a preparation for colonoscopy.

== Effects ==
Orally administered sodium picosulfate is generally used for thorough evacuation of the bowel, usually for patients who are preparing to undergo a colonoscopy. It takes 12–24 hours to work, since it works in the colon.

Abdominal cramps and diarrhea are normal effects of picosulfate and should be expected.

The use of sodium picosulfate has also been associated with certain electrolyte disturbances, such as hyponatremia and hypokalemia. Patients are often required to drink large amounts of clear fluids, to compensate for dehydration and to reestablish normal electrolyte balance.

== Mechanism of action ==
Sodium picosulfate is a prodrug. It has no significant direct physiological effect on the intestine; however, it is metabolised by gut bacteria into the active compound 4,4'-dihydroxydiphenyl-(2-pyridyl)methane (DPM, BHPM). This compound is a stimulant laxative and increases peristalsis in the gut.

Sodium picosulfate is typically prescribed in a combined formulation with magnesium citrate, an osmotic laxative. This combination is a highly effective laxative, often prescribed to patients for bowel cleansing prior to colonoscopies.

== Society and culture ==
=== Brand names ===
It is sold under the brand names Sodipic Picofast, Laxoberal, Laxoberon, Purg-Odan, Picolax, Guttalax, Namilax, Pico-Salax, PicoPrep, and Prepopik, among others.

Clenpiq is a combination of sodium picosulfate, magnesium oxide, and citric acid.
