= Dantron =

Chemical compound

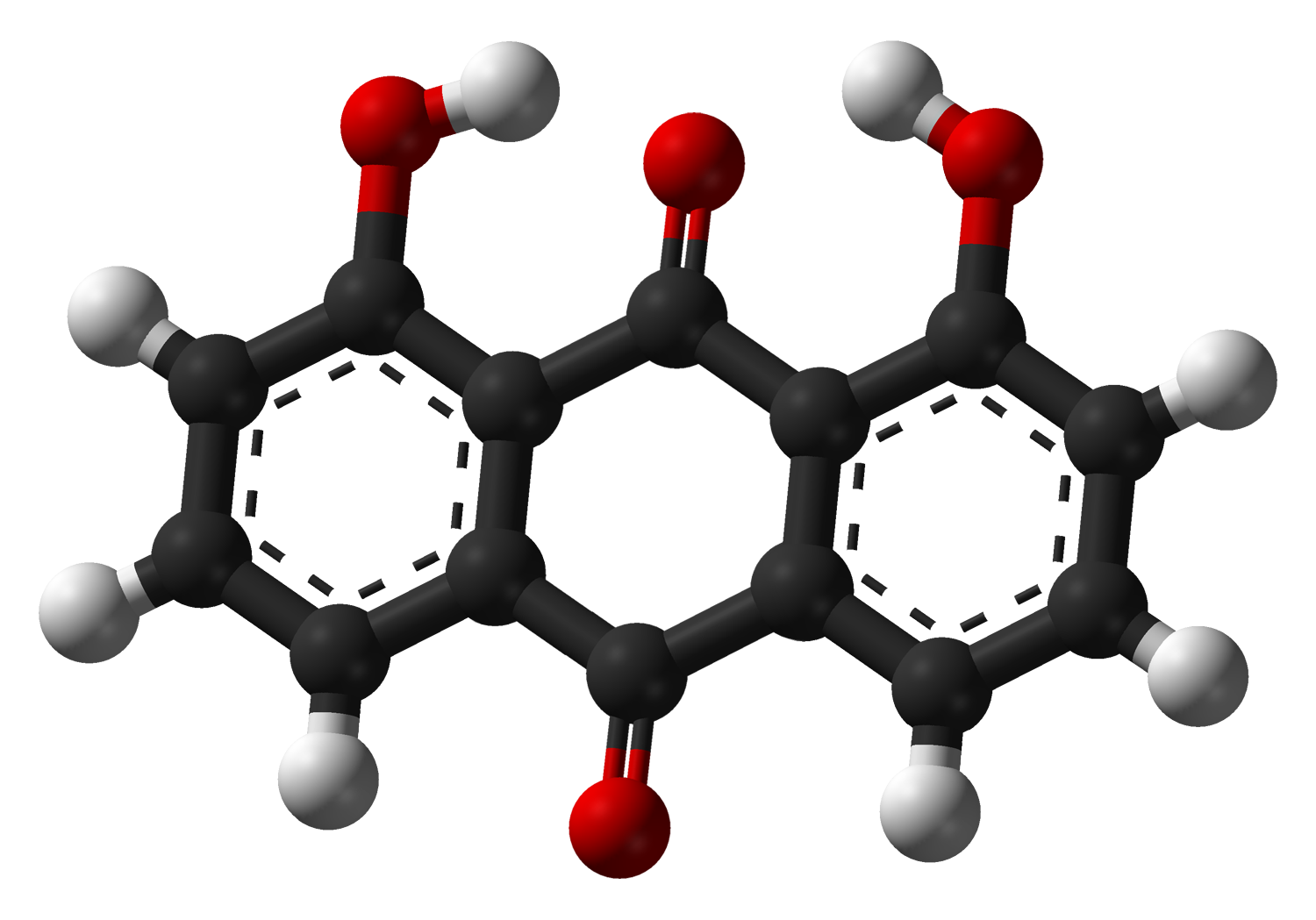

Clinical data
- Routes of administration: Oral, rectal (enema)
- ATC code: A06AB03 (WHO) A06AG03 (WHO)

Identifiers
- IUPAC name: 1,8-dihydroxyanthracene-9,10-dione
- CAS Number: 117-10-2
- PubChem CID: 2950
- DrugBank: DB04816
- ChemSpider: 2845
- UNII: Z4XE6IBF3V
- KEGG: D07107
- ChEBI: CHEBI:3682
- ChEMBL: ChEMBL53418
- NIAID ChemDB: 001375
- CompTox Dashboard (EPA): DTXSID9020328
- ECHA InfoCard: 100.003.794

Chemical and physical data
- Formula: C_{14}H_{8}O_{4}
- Molar mass: 240.214 g·mol^{−1}
- 3D model (JSmol): Interactive image
- Density: 1.575 g/cm^{3} g/cm^{3}
- SMILES: O=C2c1cccc(O)c1C(=O)c3c2cccc3O
- InChI: InChI=1S/C14H8O4/c15-9-5-1-3-7-11(9)14(18)12-8(13(7)17)4-2-6-10(12)16/h1-6,15-16H; Key:QBPFLULOKWLNNW-UHFFFAOYSA-N

Dantron (INN), also known as chrysazin or 1,8-dihydroxyanthraquinone, is an orange-colored organic substance. Many structurally-related compounds are known. In terms of its molecular structure, it is related anthraquinone by the replacement of two hydrogen atoms by hydroxyl groups (–OH). It is used in some countries as a stimulant laxative.

It should not be confused with ondansetron, an unrelated drug that was marketed in South Africa under the trade name "Dantron".

== Medical uses ==
In the USA, dantron is not used because it is considered to be a carcinogen.

In the UK it is considered a possible carcinogen and so its use is restricted to patients who already have a diagnosis of terminal cancer. It is mainly used in palliative care to counteract the constipating effects of opioids. Its British Approved Name was danthron, but it has now been changed to "dantron", the recommended International Nonproprietary Name.

Dantron can be administered orally, or can be administered rectally as an enema either in combination with other laxatives or alone.

== Side effects ==
Dantron has the notable side-effect of causing red-colored urine.

== See also ==
- Hydroxyanthraquinone
- Rhein (molecule)
