= Whole bowel irrigation =

Medical process

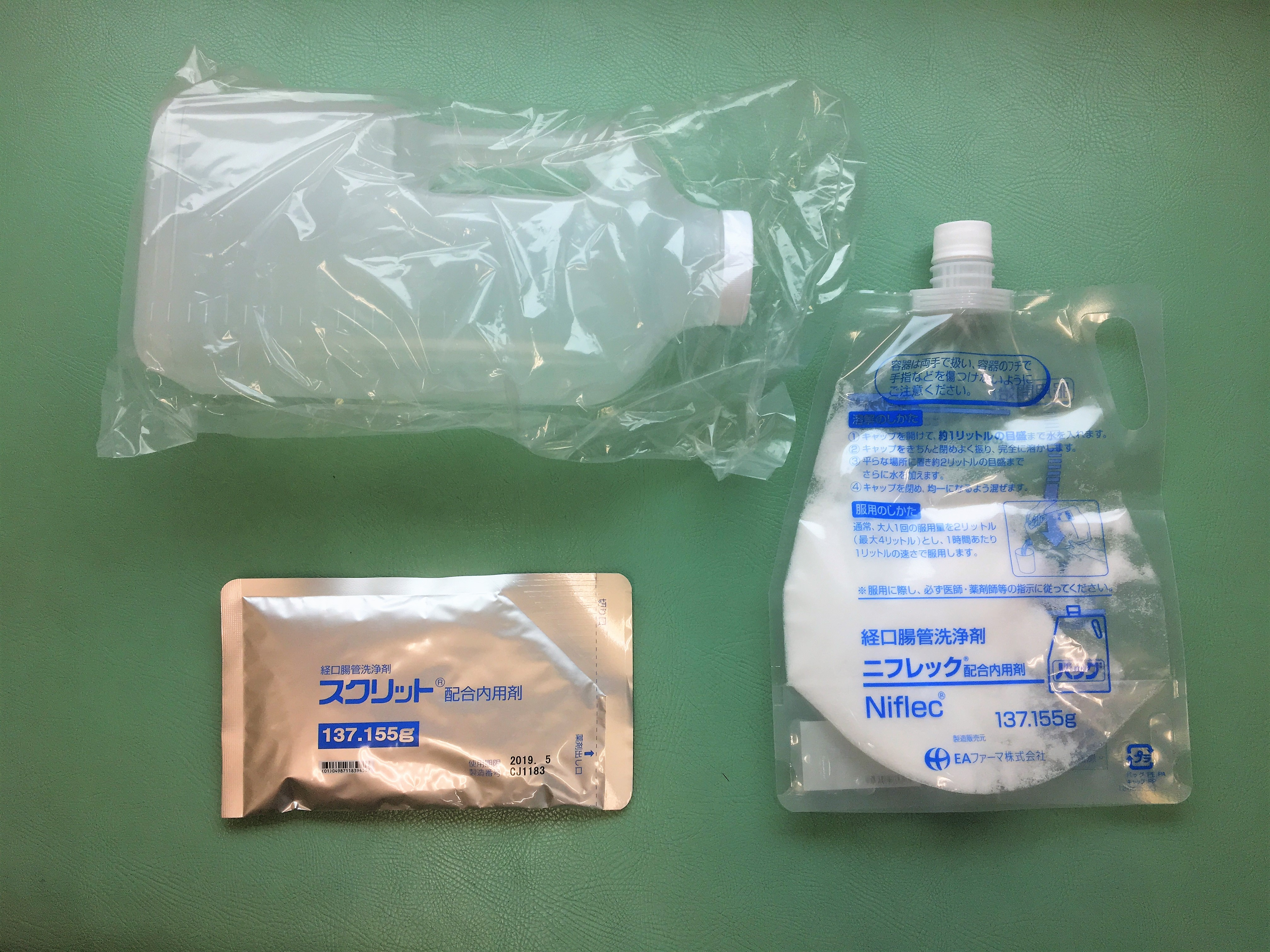
Drugs for whole bowel irrigation: left side "SCRIT", right side "Niflec". The main component of both products is anhydrous sodium sulfate. Contains a small amount of polyethylene glycol.

Whole bowel irrigation (WBI) is a medical process involving the rapid administration of large volumes of an osmotically balanced macrogol solution (GoLYTELY, CoLyte), either orally or via a nasogastric tube, to flush out the entire gastrointestinal tract.

== History ==
Whole bowel irrigation was originally developed to cleanse the large bowel before surgery or colonoscopy. Initially a solution of sodium chloride, potassium chloride, and sodium bicarbonate was used but this electrolyte solution was shown to be absorbed by the body, sometimes leading to complications. To solve this problem a specialized irrigation fluid was developed consisting mainly of an iso-osmolar solution of macrogol. With the macrogol solution there is negligible fluid or electrolyte absorption and several studies have shown the overall safety of the procedure. Whole bowel irrigation was also suggested as a possible treatment for toxic ingestions. WBI has the effect of mechanically flushing the ingested poison out of the gastrointestinal tract before it can be absorbed into the body. A study in 1987 provided evidence that whole bowel irrigation is an effective and safe gastrointestinal decontamination procedure for acute poisoning. Its common administration for toxic ingestions has been largely replaced with that of activated charcoal.

== Indications ==
Whole bowel irrigation is sometimes used prior to colonoscopy, bowel surgery, other abdominal/pelvic surgery, or a barium enema examination, to cleanse the intestines, enhancing visibility of the intestines' inner surfaces, preventing complications from occurring as a result of spillage of bowel contents into the abdominal cavity, and potentially providing other benefits depending on the type of procedure being performed.

Whole bowel irrigation is also used in certain poisoning situations. It is usually reserved for patients who have ingested toxic doses of medications not absorbed by activated charcoal (such as iron and lithium), potentially toxic ingestions of sustained-release or enteric-coated drugs, or in the situation of packaged drug ingestion (body packing/stuffing).

== Technique ==
Whole bowel irrigation is undertaken either by having the patient drink the solution or a nasogastric tube is inserted and the solution is delivered down the tube into the stomach. When administered to adolescents and adults as preparation for surgery, colonoscopy, or another procedure, the solution is usually taken orally, unless oral administration is contraindicated. Orally, the solution may be taken in a wide variety of settings, and is usually taken at a rate of 240 mL (8 oz.) every 10 to 20 minutes. Nasogastrically, the solution is generally administered at a rate of 500 mL/h in children 9 months to 6 years, 1000 mL/h in children 6 to 12 years, and 1500 to 2000 mL/h in adolescents and adults. When used to cleanse the bowels for a procedure, the total volume of solution prescribed is usually 2 to 4 liters, which is often taken at home by the patient.

When used as treatment for poisoning, the procedure is usually performed in a healthcare facility, and normally continues until the rectal effluent is clear.

Vomiting is a common side effect of the macrogol solutions used for WBI, which may hinder the effectiveness of the procedure for any indication. In cases of poisoning, the presence of vomiting prior to the procedure is not uncommon. It may be the result of administration of ipecac prior to the procedure, and/or a symptom of the poisoning itself. Overdoses of such drugs as aspirin and theophylline are likely to result in vomiting. Whenever vomiting occurs before or during WBI, the rate of the procedure may need to be slowed, alternatives considered, or an antiemetic such as metoclopramide administered.

== Contraindications ==
Major gastrointestinal dysfunction precludes the use of whole bowel irrigation. WBI is specifically contraindicated in the presence of ileus, significant gastrointestinal hemorrhage, hemodynamic instability, uncontrollable intractable vomiting, bowel obstruction, bowel perforation, and in patients with a decreased level of consciousness with a compromised unprotected airway.

== Complications ==
Minor complications include nausea, vomiting, abdominal cramps, and bloating. Patients with altered mental status or a compromised and unprotected airway are at risk for pulmonary aspiration.

== Alternatives ==
Several other laxatives are available for cleansing of the bowels prior to colonoscopy, surgery, or other procedures. Studies have shown some of these to be comparable to macrogol solutions in terms of effectiveness and better tolerated by patients due to the lower volume of laxative which must be ingested. Enemas are another option.

Alternatives to WBI in cases of poisoning may include gastric lavage, activated charcoal, syrup of ipecac, mechanically induced vomiting, administration of alternate laxatives, antidotes and/or symptomatic treatment for systemic poisoning, and watchful waiting. However, every poisoning situation is unique and appropriate treatment options are evaluated on a case-by-case basis.

== See also ==
- Poison
- Colonoscopy
