= Polycarbophil calcium =

Pharmaceutical drug

Clinical data
- AHFS/Drugs.com: Multum Consumer Information
- Routes of administration: Oral (tablets)
- ATC code: A06AC08 (WHO)

Legal status
- Legal status: US: OTC

Identifiers
- CAS Number: 9003-97-8
- PubChem SID: 49901815
- ChemSpider: none
- UNII: W25LM17A4W
- KEGG: D03306

Chemical and physical data
- Formula: (C_{3}H_{3}Ca_{1/2}O_{2})_{a}(C_{6}H_{10}O_{2})_{b}

Polycarbophil calcium (INN) is a drug used as a stool stabilizer. Chemically, it is a synthetic polymer of polyacrylic acid cross-linked with divinyl glycol, with calcium as a counter-ion.

== Clinical uses ==
It is used as stool stabilizer to treat constipation, diarrhea and abdominal discomfort. Bulk laxatives absorb liquid in the intestines and swell to form a soft bulky stool. The bulky mass stimulates the intestinal muscles, speeding stool transit time through the colon. Results usually occur within 12 to 72 hours. Calcium polycarbophil will not work without increased fluid intake.

Calcium polycarbophil has been marketed as an over-the-counter agent used for treating functional bowel disorder and as a bulk-producing agent.

A study looked at the effects of calcium polycarbophil on general irritable bowel syndrome (IBS) symptoms. Fourteen patients with IBS-diarrhea and twelve with IBS-constipation were given calcium polycarbophil for eight weeks and their colon transit times were measured with radiopaque markers in the colon. The patients with diarrhea reported fewer bowel movements, more solid stools and reduced abdominal pain. Patients with constipation reported more frequent bowel movements, looser stools and less pain.

The human stomach presents a mild acidic environment due to the presence of HCl. Polycarbophil absorbs about ten times its own weight of water under acidic conditions, but the swelling ratio markedly increases at above pH 4.0 and reaches 70 times the initial weight under pH-neutral conditions. The swelling of polycarbophil is not affected by non-ionic osmolarity, but by ionic strength, showing a decrease with increase of ionic strength. Monovalent metal ions such as sodium and potassium ions in gastrointestinal fluid do not reduce the equilibrium swelling of polycarbophil, but divalent ions such as calcium and magnesium ions do. However, calcium ions only slightly reduce the equilibrium swelling under sodium-rich conditions.

== Adverse effects ==
Common side effects can include:

- Mild stomach pain
- Bloating
- Gas

Seek medical attention if:

- severe stomach cramps
- rectal bleeding
- no bowel movement within 3 days after using polycarbophil

A different representation: polyacrylic acid residues are shown in red, residues of the cross-linker divinyl glycol (3,4-dihydroxy-1,5-hexadiene) in blue.
