= ATC code A06 =

ATC code A06 Drugs for constipation is a therapeutic subgroup of the Anatomical Therapeutic Chemical Classification System, a system of alphanumeric codes developed by the World Health Organization (WHO) for the classification of drugs and other medical products. Subgroup A06 is part of the anatomical group A Alimentary tract and metabolism.

Codes for veterinary use (ATCvet codes) can be created by placing the letter Q in front of the human ATC code: for example, QA06.
National versions of the ATC classification may include additional codes not present in this list, which follows the WHO version.

== A06A Drugs for constipation ==
=== A06AA Softeners, emollients ===
A06AA01 Liquid paraffin
A06AA02 Docusate sodium
A06AA51 Liquid paraffin, combinations

=== A06AB Contact laxatives ===
A06AB01 Oxyphenisatine
A06AB02 Bisacodyl
A06AB03 Dantron
A06AB04 Phenolphthalein
A06AB05 Castor oil
A06AB06 Senna glycosides
A06AB07 Cascara
A06AB08 Sodium picosulfate
A06AB09 Bisoxatin
A06AB20 Contact laxatives in combination
A06AB30 Contact laxatives in combination with belladonna alkaloids
A06AB52 Bisacodyl, combinations
A06AB53 Dantron, combinations
A06AB56 Senna glycosides, combinations
A06AB57 Cascara, combinations
A06AB58 Sodium picosulfate, combinations

=== A06AC Bulk-forming laxatives ===
A06AC01 Ispaghula (psylla seeds)
A06AC02 Ethulose
A06AC03 Sterculia
A06AC05 Linseed
A06AC06 Methylcellulose
A06AC07 Triticum (wheat fibre)
A06AC08 Polycarbophil calcium
A06AC51 Ispaghula, combinations
A06AC53 Sterculia, combinations
A06AC55 Linseed, combinations

=== A06AD Osmotically acting laxatives ===
A06AD01 Magnesium carbonate
A06AD02 Magnesium oxide
A06AD03 Magnesium peroxide
A06AD04 Magnesium sulfate
A06AD10 Mineral salts in combination
A06AD11 Lactulose
A06AD12 Lactitol
A06AD13 Sodium sulfate
A06AD14 Pentaerithrityl
A06AD15 Macrogol
A06AD16 Mannitol
A06AD17 Sodium phosphate
A06AD18 Sorbitol
A06AD19 Magnesium citrate
A06AD21 Sodium tartrate
A06AD61 Lactulose, combinations
A06AD65 Macrogol, combinations

=== A06AG Enemas ===
A06AG01 Sodium phosphate
A06AG02 Bisacodyl
A06AG03 Dantron, including combinations
A06AG04 Glycerol
A06AG06 Oil
A06AG07 Sorbitol
A06AG10 Docusate sodium, including combinations
A06AG11 Sodium lauryl sulfoacetate, including combinations
A06AG20 Combinations

=== A06AH Peripheral opioid receptor antagonists ===
A06AH01 Methylnaltrexone bromide
A06AH02 Alvimopan
A06AH03 Naloxegol
A06AH04 Naloxone
A06AH05 Naldemedine

=== A06AX Other drugs for constipation ===
A06AX01 Glycerol
A06AX02 Carbon dioxide producing drugs
A06AX03 Lubiprostone
A06AX04 Linaclotide
A06AX05 Prucalopride
A06AX06 Tegaserod
A06AX07 Plecanatide
A06AX08 Tenapanor
A06AX09 Elobixibat
