= Colonoscopy =

Examination of the bowel

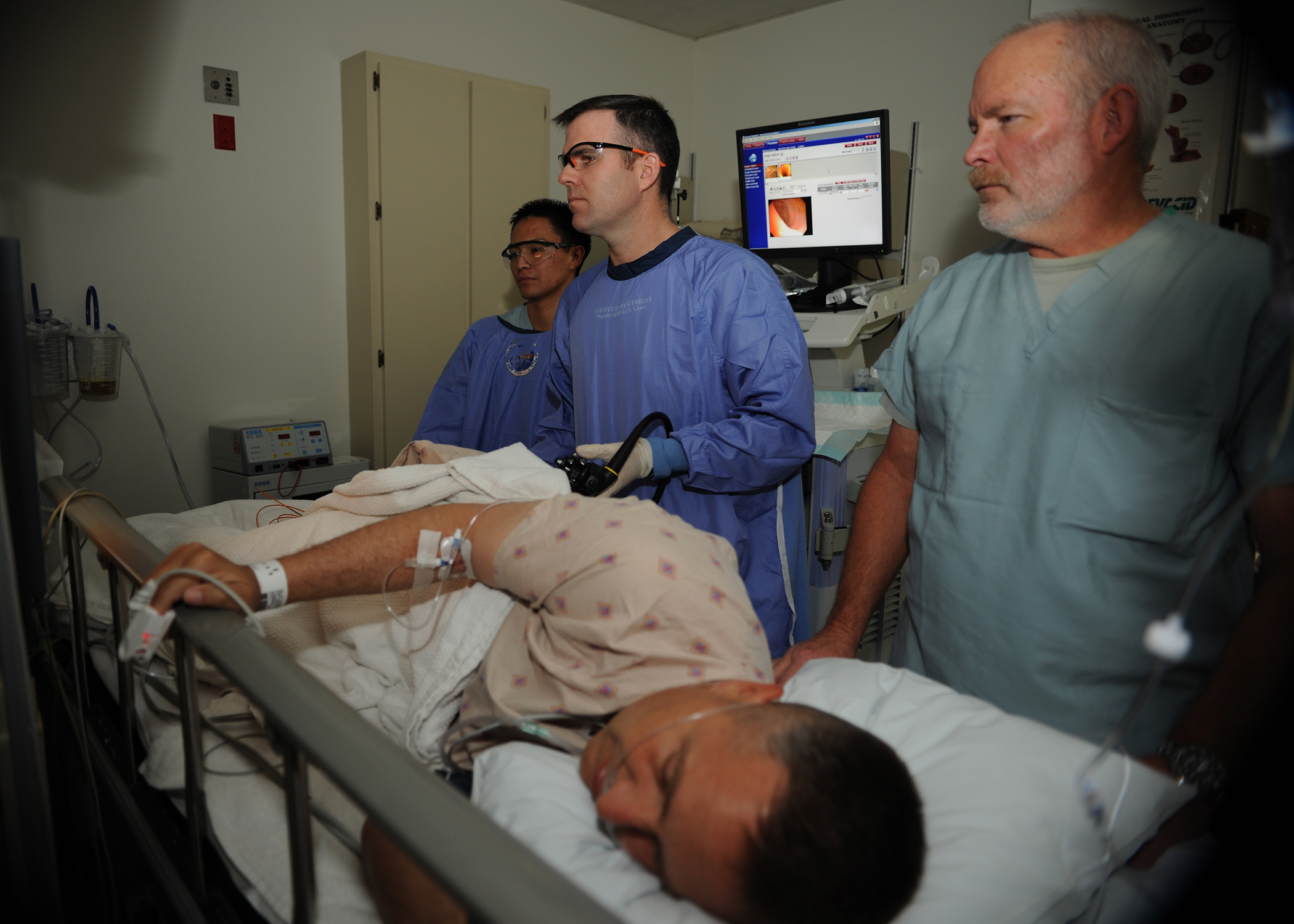
- Colonoscopy being performed
- ICD-9-CM: 45.23
- MeSH: D003113
- OPS-301 code: 1-650
- MedlinePlus: 003886

Colonoscopy (/ˌkɒləˈnɒskəpi/) or coloscopy (/kəˈlɒskəpi/) is a medical procedure involving the endoscopic examination of the large bowel (colon) and the distal portion of the small bowel. This examination is performed using either a CCD camera or a fiber optic camera, which is mounted on a flexible tube and passed through the anus.

The purpose of a colonoscopy is to inspect the internal lining of the colon wall, to detect ulceration or precancerous polyps, and to permit biopsy or removal of suspected colorectal cancer lesions.

Colonoscopy surveys the entire colon, which runs 120 to 150 cm (4–5 ft). Sigmoidoscopy is similar, but only surveys the sigmoid colon, which comprises 60 cm of the distal (left) side of the colon. The benefits of colonoscopy for cancer survival have primarily been associated with the detection of lesions in the distal portion of the colon.

Routine use of colonoscopy screening varies globally. In the US, colonoscopy is a commonly recommended and widely utilized screening method for colorectal cancer, often beginning at age 45 or 50, depending on risk factors and guidelines from organizations like the American Cancer Society. However, in the European Union, several countries primarily employ fecal occult blood testing (FOBT) or sigmoidoscopy for population-based screening. These variations stem from many factors. Recent studies have stressed the need for screening strategies and awareness campaigns to combat colorectal cancer - on a global scale.

Research is underway to identify the characteristics of patients that may indicate potential difficulties in performing a colonoscopy in a given individual, both in children and adults.

== Medical uses ==
Inner diameters of colon sections

Conditions that call for colonoscopies include gastrointestinal hemorrhage, unexplained changes in bowel habit and suspicion of malignancy. Colonoscopies are often used to diagnose colon polyp and colon cancer, but are also frequently used to diagnose inflammatory bowel disease.

Fecal occult blood is a quick test which can be done to test for microscopic traces of blood in the stool. A positive test is almost always an indication to do a colonoscopy. In most cases the positive result is just due to hemorrhoids; however, it can also be due to diverticulosis, inflammatory bowel disease (Crohn's disease, ulcerative colitis), colon cancer, or polyps. Colonic polypectomy has become a routine part of colonoscopy, allowing quick and simple removal of polyps during the procedure, without invasive surgery.

Occasional rectal bleeding may have multiple non-serious potential causes.

=== Colon cancer screening ===
Colonoscopy is one of the colorectal cancer screening tests recommended to people in the US who are 45 to 75 years of age. The other screening tests are flexible sigmoidoscopy, double-contrast barium enema, computed tomographic (CT) colonography (virtual colonoscopy), guaiac-based fecal occult blood test (gFOBT), fecal immunochemical test (FIT), and multitarget stool DNA screening test (Cologuard).

Subsequent rescreenings are scheduled based on the initial results found, with a ten-year recall being common for colonoscopies that produce normal results.

Among people who have had an initial colonoscopy that found no polyps, the risk of developing colorectal cancer within five years is extremely low. Therefore, the risks of the procedure outweigh the benefits of having another colonoscopy sooner than five years after the first screening.

Some medical societies in the US recommend a screening colonoscopy every ten years beginning at age 50 for adults without increased risk for colorectal cancer. Research shows that the risk of cancer is low for 10 years if a high-quality colonoscopy does not detect cancer, so tests for this purpose are indicated every ten years.

Colonoscopy screening is associated with approximately two-thirds fewer deaths due to colorectal cancers on the left side of the colon, and is not associated with a significant reduction in deaths from right-sided disease. It is speculated that colonoscopy might reduce rates of death from colon cancer by detecting some colon polyps and cancers on the left side of the colon early enough that they may be treated, and a smaller number on the right side.

Since polyps often take 10 to 15 years to transform into cancer in someone at average risk of colorectal cancer, guidelines recommend 10 years after a normal screening colonoscopy before the next colonoscopy. (This interval does not apply to people at high risk of colorectal cancer or those who experience symptoms of the disease.)

The large randomized pragmatic clinical trial NordICC was the first published trial on the use of colonoscopy as a screening test to prevent colorectal cancer, related death, and death from any cause. It included 84,585 healthy men and women aged 55 to 64 years in Poland, Norway, and Sweden, who were randomized to either receive an invitation to undergo a single screening colonoscopy (invited group) or to receive no invitation or screening (usual-care group). Of the 28,220 people in the invited group, 11,843 (42.0%) underwent screening. A total of 15 people who underwent colonoscopy (0.13%) had major bleeding after polyp removal.

None of the participants experienced a colon perforation due to colonoscopy. After 10 years, an intention-to-screen analysis showed a significant relative risk reduction of 18% in the risk of colorectal cancer (0.98% in the invited group vs. 1.20% in the usual-care group). The analysis showed no significant change in the risk of death from colorectal cancer (0.28% vs. 0.31%) or in the risk of death from any cause (11.03% vs. 11.04%). To prevent one case of colorectal cancer, 455 invitations to colonoscopy were required.

As of 2026, the CONFIRM trial, a randomized trial evaluating colonoscopy vs. fecal immunochemical test is currently ongoing. This study includes 50,126 military veterans, mostly males, in the US with follow up planned through 2028.

In 2021, the US spent $43 billion on cancer screening to prevent five types of cancer, with colonoscopies accounting for 55% of the total. The death rate from colon cancer has been on a linear decline for 40 years, falling by nearly 50 percent from the 1980s (when few were screened) to 2024; however, the increase in screening did not accelerate the decline. Therefore, resources devoted to cancer screening would be better directed toward ensuring widespread access to effective cancer treatment.

=== Recommendations ===
The American Cancer Society issues recommendations on colorectal cancer screening guidelines. These guidelines often change and are updated as new studies and technologies have become available

Many other national organizations also issue such guidance, such as the UK's NHS and various European agencies, guidance can vary between such agencies.

=== Medicare coverage ===
In the United States, Medicare insurance covers a number of colorectal-cancer screening tests.

== Procedural risks ==
The American Society for Gastrointestinal Endoscopy estimates around three in 1,000 colonoscopies lead to serious complications.

=== Perforation ===
The most serious complication is generally gastrointestinal perforation, which is life-threatening and requires immediate surgical intervention.

=== Issues from general anesthesia ===
As with any procedure involving anesthesia, complications can occur, such as:

- allergic reactions,
- cardiovascular issues,
- paradoxical agitation,
- aspiration,
- dental injury.

=== Colon preparation electrolyte issues ===
Electrolyte imbalance caused by bowel preparation solutions is possible, but current bowel cleansing laxatives are formulated to account for electrolyte balance, making this a very rare event.

=== Other ===
During colonoscopies, when a polyp is removed (a polypectomy), the risk of complication increases. One of the most serious complications is postpolypectomy coagulation syndrome, occurring in 1 in 1000 procedures. It results from a burn injury to the wall of the colon causing abdominal pain, fever, elevated white blood cell count and elevated serum C-reactive protein. Treatment consists of intravenous fluids, antibiotics, and avoiding oral intake of food, water, etc. until symptoms improve. Risk factors include right colon polypectomy, large polyp size (>2 cm), non-polypoid lesions (laterally spreading lesions), and hypertension.

Although rare, infections of the colon are a potential colonoscopy risk. The colon is not a sterile environment, and infections can occur during biopsies from what is essentially a 'small shallow cut', enabling bacterial intrusion into lower parts of the colon wall. In cases where the lining of the colon is perforated, bacteria can infiltrate the abdominal cavity.

Minor colonoscopy risks may include nausea, vomiting or allergies to the sedatives that may have been used. If medication is given intravenously, the vein may become irritated, or mild phlebitis may occur.

== Technique ==
=== Preparation ===
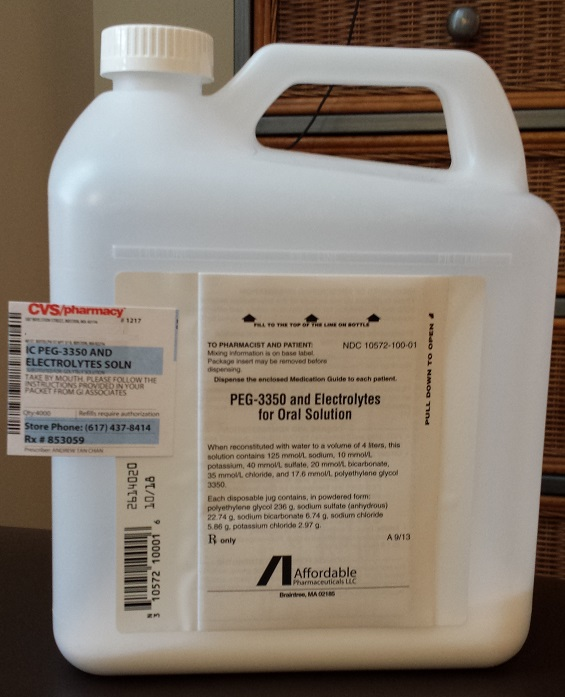
A container of PEG (polyethylene glycol or macrogol) with electrolyte used to clean out the intestines before certain bowel exam procedures such as a colonoscopy.

The colon must be free of solid matter for the test to be performed properly. For one to three days, the patient is required to follow a low fiber or clear-liquid-only diet. Examples of clear fluids are apple juice, chicken and/or beef broth or bouillon, lemon-lime soda, lemonade, sports drink, and water. It is important that the patient remains hydrated. Sports drinks contain electrolytes which are depleted during the purging of the bowel. Drinks containing fiber such as prune and orange juice should not be consumed, nor should liquids dyed red, purple, orange, or sometimes brown; however, cola is allowed. In most cases, tea or coffee taken without milk are allowed.

The day before the colonoscopy (or colorectal surgery), the patient is either given a laxative preparation (such as bisacodyl, phospho soda, sodium picosulfate, or sodium phosphate and/or magnesium citrate) and large quantities of fluid, or whole bowel irrigation is performed using a solution of polyethylene glycol and electrolytes.

The patient may be asked not to take aspirin or similar products such as salicylate, ibuprofen, etc. for up to ten days before the procedure to avoid the risk of bleeding if a polypectomy is performed during the procedure. A blood test may be performed before the procedure.

=== Procedure ===
Schematic overview of colonoscopy procedure

During the procedure, the patient is often given sedation intravenously, employing agents such as fentanyl or midazolam. Although meperidine (Demerol) may be used as an alternative to fentanyl, the concern of seizures has relegated this agent to second choice for sedation behind the combination of fentanyl and midazolam. The average person will receive a combination of these two drugs, usually between 25 and 100 μg IV fentanyl and 1–4 mg IV midazolam. Sedation practices vary between practitioners and nations; in some clinics in Norway, sedation is rarely administered.

The first step is usually a digital rectal examination (DRE), to examine the tone of the anal sphincter and to determine if preparation has been adequate. A DRE is also useful in detecting anal neoplasms and the clinician may note issues with the prostate gland in men undergoing this procedure. The endoscope is then passed through the anus up the rectum, the colon (sigmoid, descending, transverse and ascending colon, the cecum), and ultimately the terminal ileum. The endoscope has a movable tip and multiple channels for instrumentation, air, suction and light. The bowel is occasionally insufflated with air to maximize visibility (a procedure that gives the patient the false sensation of needing to take a bowel movement). Biopsies are frequently taken for histology. Additionally in a procedure known as chromoendoscopy, a contrast-dye (such as indigo carmine) may be sprayed through the endoscope onto the bowel wall to help visualize any abnormalities in the mucosal morphology. A Cochrane review updated in 2016 found strong evidence that chromoscopy enhances the detection of cancerous tumors in the colon and rectum.

In most experienced hands, the endoscope is advanced to the junction of where the colon and small bowel join up (cecum) in under 10 minutes in 95% of cases. Due to tight turns and redundancy in areas of the colon that are not "fixed", loops may form in which advancement of the endoscope creates a "bowing" effect that causes the tip to actually retract. These loops often result in discomfort due to stretching of the colon and its associated mesentery. Manoeuvres to "reduce" or remove the loop include pulling the endoscope backwards while twisting it. Alternatively, body position changes and abdominal support from external hand pressure can often "straighten" the endoscope to allow the scope to move forward. In a minority of patients, looping is often cited as a cause for an incomplete examination. Usage of alternative instruments leading to completion of the examination has been investigated, including use of pediatric colonoscope, push enteroscope and upper GI endoscope variants.

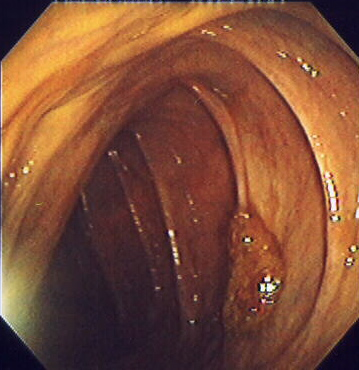
Polyp is identified.

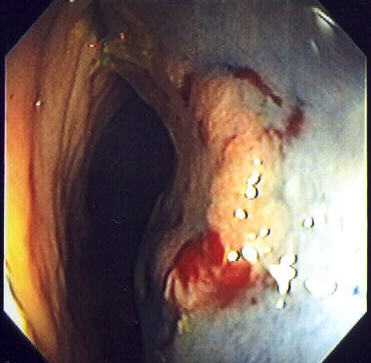
A sterile solution is injected under the polyp to lift it away from deeper tissues.

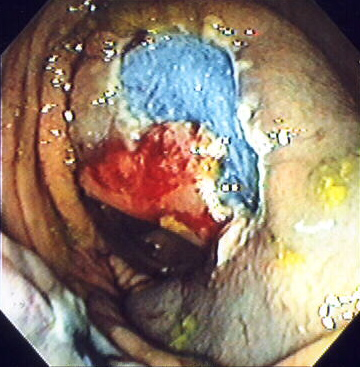
A portion of the polyp is now removed.

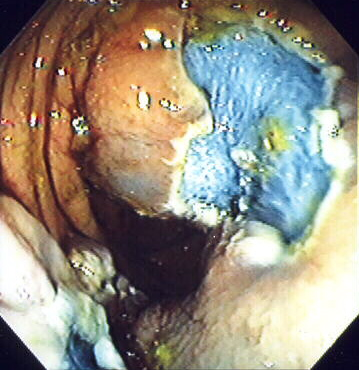
The polyp is fully removed.

=== Patient comfort and pain management ===
The pain associated with the procedure is not caused by the insertion of the scope but rather by the inflation of the colon in order to do the inspection. The scope itself is essentially a long, flexible tube about a centimeter in diameter — that is, as big around as the little finger, which is less than the diameter of an average stool.

The colon has sensors that can tell when there is unexpected gas pushing the colon walls out—which may cause mild discomfort. Usually, total anesthesia or a partial twilight sedative are used to reduce the patient's awareness of pain or discomfort, or just the unusual sensations of the procedure. Once the colon has been inflated, the doctor inspects it with the scope as it is slowly pulled backward. If any polyps are found they are then cut out for later biopsy.

Colonoscopy can be carried out without any sedation and a number of studies have been performed evaluating colonoscopy outcomes without sedation., though in the US and EU the procedure is usually carried out with some form of sedation.

== Economics ==
Researchers have found that older patients with three or more significant health problems (i.e., dementia or heart failure) had higher rates of repeat colonoscopies without medical indications. These patients are less likely to live long enough to develop colon cancer.

== History ==
After Curtiss succeeded in 1956 in coating long, fine glass fibers – in order to reduce information and light losses during image transmission – and bundling them in parallel, the basis for flexible fiber endoscopy was laid. From Von Hirschowiz's report on the first functioning fiber gastroscope in 1957, however, it took another 10 years until the limits of rigid rectoscopy could be regularly overcome with a practical fiberscope. The technical requirements for building a fiber endoscope for colon examinations were extensive. A fiber optic bundle for image transmission, a second bundle for illumination, a control system including wires for bending the instrument tip, tubing for air insufflation and a biopsy channel had to be accommodated in a long, flexible, and thin shaft. The technical pioneering work was carried out by the companies ACMI, Eder Instrument Co., Machida, Olympus, and Sass Wolf. They were supported in this effort by – to name just a few – Overholt (USA), Deyhle, Ottenjann (Germany), and Matsunaga, Niwa, Watanabe, and Yamagata (Japan).

In the 1960s, numerous prototypes were built, which were continually improved (materials, fiber optics, control technology, elasticity, etc.). The first practical fiber sigmoidoscope with a tip that could be bent 90° in all directions and a shaft length of 50 cm was presented by Overholt, in 1967. Niwa Matsunaga and Yamagata reported in 1969 on instruments up to 120 cm long, and Deyhle on an instrument with a tip that could be bent in all directions.

In 1970, Deyhle, Nagasako and Watanabe reported successful examinations extending into the cecum using instruments from Machida and Olympus. Watanabe reached the cecum in 8 of 25 cases, and Deyhle in 22 of 28. He described the insertion technique and documented it on film. The world's first paper on a series of colonoscopies describing the preparation for the examination and the colonoscope insertion technique up to the cecum was published by Deyhle in 1971. At the same time, a less significant paper appeared by Wolff and Shinya . In 1974, Deyhle reported for the first time on a series of emergency colonoscopies. During the early 1970s, colonoscopy was introduced in numerous endoscopy centers and specialty practices.

The invention and market for CCD colonoscopy was led by Fujifilm, Olympus, and Hoya in Japan. In 1982, Lawrence Kaplan of the Aspen Medical Group in St. Paul, MN, USA, reported on a series of 100 consecutive colonoscopies and upper endoscopies performed in a freestanding clinic located miles from the nearest hospital to demonstrate the safety and cost-effectiveness of these outpatient procedures. (Personal communication to the Joint Commission on Outpatient Care, May 1983)

Some of the leading medical device companies in the colonoscopy market as of 2023 include: Fujifilm, Karl Storz SE, Pro Scope Systems, Olympus Corporation, Medtronic Plc, Steris and Pentax Medical.

=== Etymology ===
The terms colonoscopy and coloscopy are derived from the ancient Greek noun κόλον, meaning colon, and the verb σκοπεῖν, look (in)to, examine. The term colonoscopy is, however, ill-constructed, as this form supposes that the first part of the compound consists of a possible root κολων- or κολον-, with the connecting vowel -o, instead of the root κόλ- of κόλον. A compound such as κολωνοειδής, 'like a hill', (with the additional -on-) is derived from the ancient Greek word κολώνη or κολωνός 'hill'. Similarly, colonoscopy (with the additional -on-) can literally be translated as "examination of the hill", instead of the "examination of the colon".

In English, multiple words exist that are derived from κόλον, such as colectomy, colocentesis, colopathy, and colostomy among many others, that actually lack the incorrect additional -on-. A few compound words, such as colonopathy, have doublets with -on- inserted.

== Society and culture ==
The procedure of colonoscopy gained national attention in the United States in 1985 when President Ronald Reagan underwent a life-saving colonoscopy.

A survey on colonoscopy shows a poor understanding of its protective value and widespread misconceptions. The public has perceptual gaps around the purpose of colonoscopies, the subjective experience of the colonoscopy procedure, and the quantity of bowel preparation needed.

Actors Ryan Reynolds and Rob McElhenney have used their social media platform to raise awareness about the importance of colonoscopy as a procedure for colon cancer screening. They filmed their own colonoscopies as part of a campaign called "Lead From Behind", demonstrating that the procedure can be both easy and lifesaving.
