= Gastrocolic reflex =

Reflex of the gastrointestinal tract in humans and other mammals

The gastrocolic reflex or gastrocolic response is a physiological reflex that controls the motility, or peristalsis, of the gastrointestinal tract following a meal. It involves an increase in motility of the colon consisting primarily of giant migrating contractions, in response to stretch in the stomach following ingestion and byproducts of digestion entering the small intestine. The reflex propels existing intestinal contents through the digestive system, helps make way for ingested food, and is responsible for the urge to defecate following a meal.

== Physiology ==
An increase in electrical activity is seen as little as 15 minutes after eating. The gastrocolic reflex is unevenly distributed throughout the colon, with the sigmoid colon exhibiting a greater phasic response to propel food distally into the rectum; however, the tonic response across the colon is uncertain. Increased pressure within the rectum acts as stimulus for defecation. Small intestine motility is also increased in response to the gastrocolic reflex.

These contractions are generated by the muscularis externa stimulated by the myenteric plexus. A number of neuropeptides have been proposed as mediators of the gastrocolic reflex. These include serotonin, neurotensin, cholecystokinin, prostaglandin E1, and gastrin.

== Clinical significance ==
Clinically, the gastrocolic reflex has been implicated in pathogenesis of irritable bowel syndrome (IBS): the very act of eating or drinking can provoke an overreaction of the gastrocolic response in some patients with IBS due to their heightened visceral sensitivity, and this can lead to abdominal pain and distension, flatulence, and diarrhea. The gastrocolic reflex has also been implicated in pathogenesis of functional constipation, where patients with spinal cord injury and diabetics with gastroparesis secondary to diabetic neuropathy have an increased colonic transit time.

The gastrocolic reflex can also be used to optimise the treatment of constipation. Since the reflex is most active in the mornings and immediately after meals, consumption of stimulant laxatives, such as sennosides and bisacodyl, during these times will augment the reflex and help increase colonic contractions and therefore defecation.
