= Bisacodyl =

Laxative

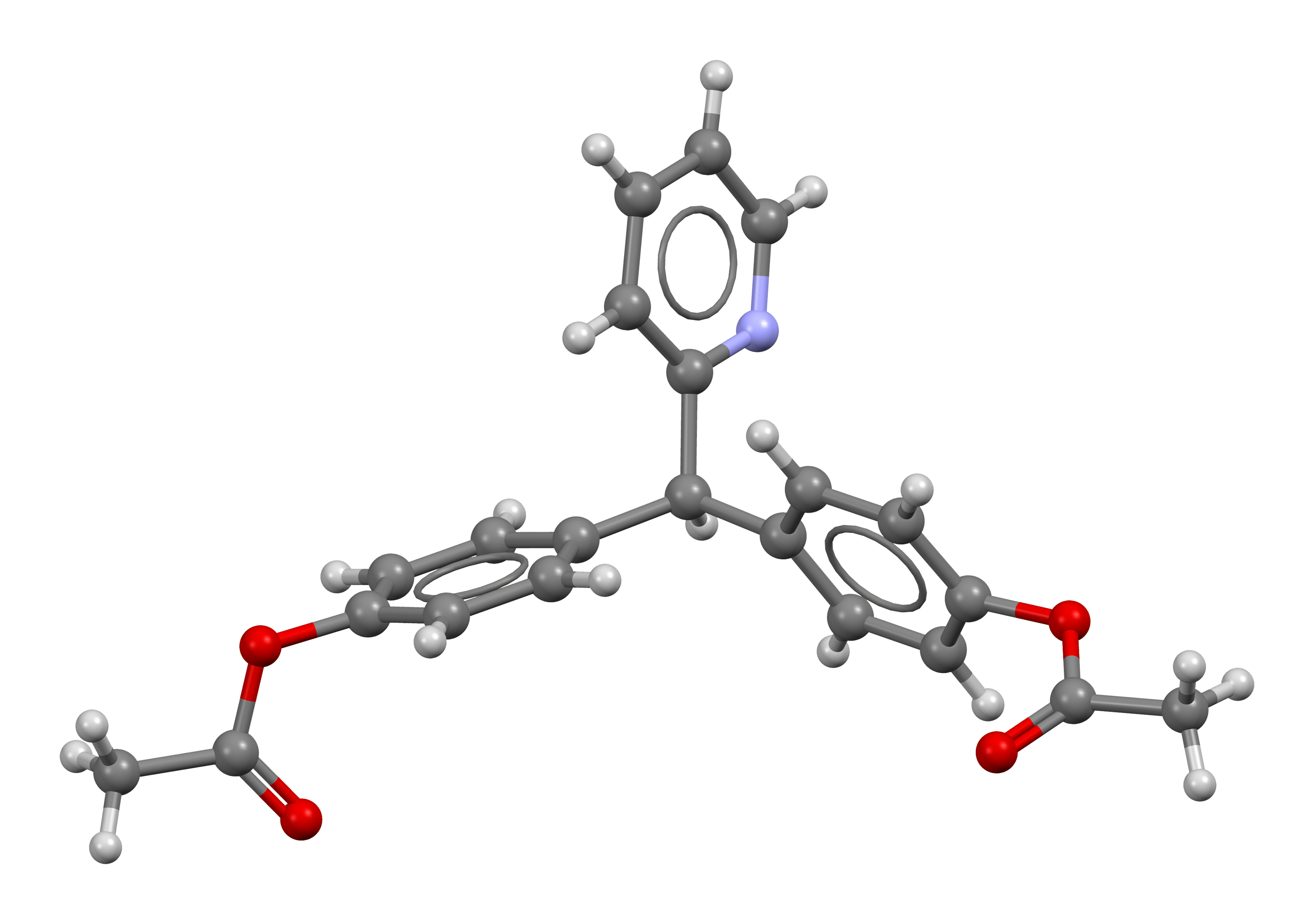

Clinical data
- Trade names: Fleet, Dulcolax, Brooklax, others
- AHFS/Drugs.com: Monograph
- MedlinePlus: a601027
- License data: US DailyMed: Bisacodyl
- Routes of administration: By mouth, rectal
- ATC code: A06AB02 (WHO) A06AG02 (WHO)

Legal status
- Legal status: AU: S2 (Pharmacy medicine); US: OTC / Rx-only; In general: Over-the-counter (OTC)

Pharmacokinetic data
- Bioavailability: 15%
- Metabolism: Liver (CYP450-mediated)
- Elimination half-life: 16 hours
- Excretion: Primarily in the feces, systemically absorbed drug is excreted in the urine

Identifiers
- IUPAC name: (pyridin-2-ylmethanediyl)dibenzene-4,1-diyl diacetate OR 4,4'-(pyridin-2-ylmethylene)bis(4,1-phenylene) diacetate
- CAS Number: 603-50-9
- PubChem CID: 2391
- DrugBank: DB09020
- ChemSpider: 2299
- UNII: 10X0709Y6I
- KEGG: D00245
- ChEMBL: ChEMBL942
- CompTox Dashboard (EPA): DTXSID1022681
- ECHA InfoCard: 100.009.132

Chemical and physical data
- Formula: C_{22}H_{19}NO_{4}
- Molar mass: 361.397 g·mol^{−1}
- 3D model (JSmol): Interactive image
- SMILES: O=C(Oc1ccc(cc1)C(c2ccc(OC(=O)C)cc2)c3ncccc3)C
- InChI: InChI=1S/C22H19NO4/c1-15(24)26-19-10-6-17(7-11-19)22(21-5-3-4-14-23-21)18-8-12-20(13-9-18)27-16(2)25/h3-14,22H,1-2H3; Key:KHOITXIGCFIULA-UHFFFAOYSA-N

Bisacodyl is an organic compound that is used as a stimulant laxative drug. It works directly on the colon to produce a bowel movement. Bisacodyl is typically prescribed for relief of episodic and chronic constipation. Bisacodyl is one of the possible medications used as part of bowel preparation before medical examinations, such as for a colonoscopy. It is sometimes used as an adjunctive medication for the temporary management of neurogenic bowel dysfunction (NBD).

Bisacodyl is a derivative of triphenylmethane. It was first used as a laxative in 1953 because of its structural similarity to phenolphthalein.

It is generally bought as an over-the-counter drug, although it did appear once (as a generic drug) on the list of the 300 most commonly prescribed medications in the United States, from 2014-2024, in the year 2023.

It is on the World Health Organization's List of Essential Medicines.

== Medical uses ==
Bisacodyl is used to treat both episodic and chronic constipation, manage symptoms of neurogenic bowel dysfunction, as well as for bowel preparation for a colonoscopy.

=== Available forms ===
Bisacodyl is marketed under the trade names Dulcolax/Durolax, Muxol, Fleet, Nourilax, Alophen, Correctol, and Carter's Little Pills (formerly Carter's Little Liver Pills), as well as being available generically. It is usually sold as 5 mg tablets, 10 mg suppositories, or 5 mg pediatric suppositories. It is also available as a 1.25 US fluid ounces (37 ml) pre-packaged enema containing a 10 mg delivered dose of liquid bisacodyl.

==== Administration ====
When administered rectally in suppository form, it is usually effective in 15 to 60 minutes. For optimal use, if used as a suppository, it is recommended that bisacodyl be given after breakfast to synchronize with the gastrocolic reflex.

As a commercially prepared micro-enema, it is usually effective in 5 to 20 minutes.

== Mechanism of action ==
Bisacodyl works by stimulating enteric neurons to cause peristalsis (i.e., colonic contractions). It is also a contact laxative; it increases fluid and salt secretion. The action of bisacodyl on the small intestine is negligible; stimulant laxatives mainly promote evacuation of the colon.
