= Laxative =

Agents that relax and loosen the bowels and stools

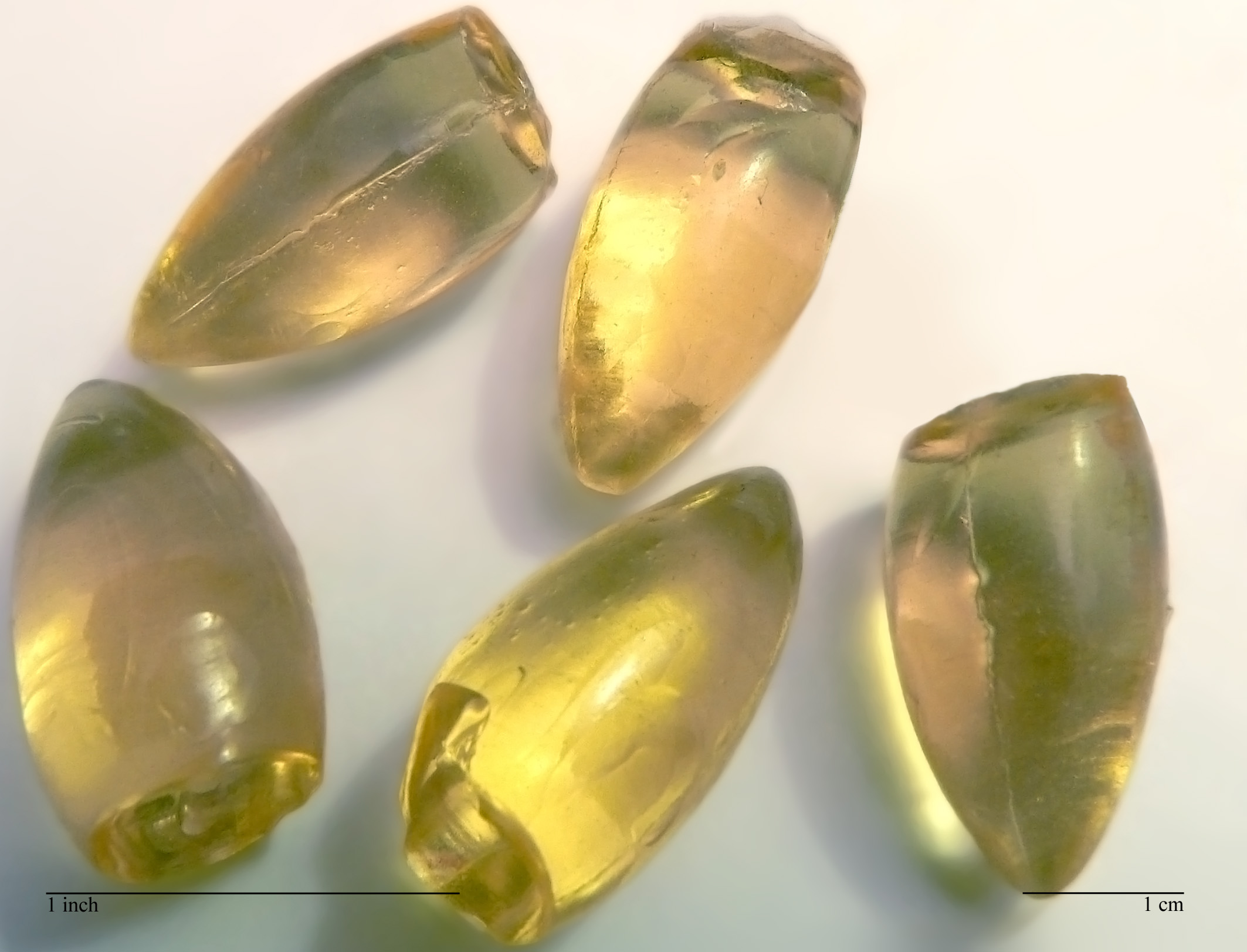
Glycerin suppositories used as laxatives.

Laxatives, purgatives, or aperients are substances that loosen stools and increase bowel movements. They are used to treat and prevent constipation.

Laxatives vary as to how they work and the side effects they may have. Certain stimulant, lubricant, and saline laxatives are used to evacuate the colon for rectal and bowel examinations, and may be supplemented by enemas under certain circumstances. Sufficiently high doses of laxatives may cause diarrhea. Some laxatives combine more than one active ingredient, and may be administered orally or rectally.

== Types ==
=== Bulk-forming agents ===
Bulk-forming laxatives, also known as roughage, are substances, such as fiber in food and hydrophilic agents in over-the-counter drugs, that add bulk and water to stools so they can pass more easily through the intestines (lower part of the digestive tract).

Properties

- Site of action: small and large intestines
- Onset of action: 12–72 hours
- Examples: dietary fiber, Metamucil, Citrucel, FiberCon

Bulk-forming agents generally have the gentlest of effects among laxatives, making them ideal for long-term maintenance of regular bowel movements.

==== Dietary fiber ====
Foods that help with laxation include fiber-rich foods. Dietary fiber includes insoluble fiber and soluble fiber, such as:

- Fruits, such as bananas, though this depends on their ripeness, kiwifruits, prunes, apples (with skin), pears (with skin), and raspberries
- Vegetables, such as broccoli, string beans, kale, spinach, cooked winter squash, cooked taro and poi, cooked peas, and baked potatoes (with skin)
- Whole grains
- Bran products
- Nuts
- Legumes, such as beans, peas, and lentils

=== Emollient agents (stool softeners) ===
Emollient laxatives, also known as stool softeners, are anionic surfactants that enable additional water and fats to be incorporated in the stool, making movement through the bowels easier.

Properties

- Site of action: small and large intestines
- Onset of action: 12–72 hours
- Examples: Docusate (Colace, Diocto), Gibs-Eze

Emollient agents prevent constipation rather than treating long-term constipation.

=== Lubricant agents ===
Lubricant laxatives are substances that coat the stool with slippery lipids and decrease colonic absorption of water so the stool slides through the colon more easily. Lubricant laxatives also increase the weight of stool and decrease intestinal transit time.

Properties

- Site of action: colon
- Onset of action: 6–8 hours
- Example: mineral oil

Mineral oils, such as liquid paraffin, are generally the only nonprescription lubricant laxatives available, but due to the risk of lipid pneumonia resulting from accidental aspiration, mineral oil is not recommended, especially in children and infants. Mineral oil may decrease the absorption of fat-soluble vitamins and some minerals.

=== Hyperosmotic agents ===
Hyperosmotic laxatives cause the intestines to hold more water, creating an osmotic gradient, which adds more pressure and stimulates bowel movement.

Properties

- Site of action: colon
- Onset of action: 12–72 hours (oral), 0.25–1 hour (rectal)
- Examples: glycerin suppositories (Hallens), sorbitol, lactulose, and polyethylene glycol (PEG - Colyte, MiraLax)

Lactulose works by the osmotic effect, which retains water in the colon; lowering the pH through bacterial fermentation to lactic, formic, and acetic acids; and increasing colonic peristalsis. Lactulose is also indicated in portal-systemic encephalopathy. Glycerin suppositories work mostly by hyperosmotic action, but the sodium stearate in the preparation also causes local irritation to the colon.

Solutions of polyethylene glycol and electrolytes (sodium chloride, sodium bicarbonate, potassium chloride, and sometimes sodium sulfate) are used for whole bowel irrigation, a process designed to prepare the bowel for surgery or colonoscopy and to treat certain types of poisoning. Brand names for these solutions include GoLytely, GlycoLax, Cosmocol, CoLyte, Miralax, Movicol, NuLytely, Suprep, and Fortrans. Solutions of sorbitol (SoftLax) have similar effects.

=== Saline laxative agents ===
Saline laxatives are nonabsorbable, osmotically active substances that attract and retain water in the intestinal lumen, increasing intraluminal pressure that mechanically stimulates evacuation of the bowel. Magnesium-containing agents also cause the release of cholecystokinin, which increases intestinal motility and fluid secretion. Saline laxatives may alter a patient's fluid and electrolyte balance.

Properties

- Site of action: small and large intestines
- Onset of action: 0.5–3 hours (oral), 2–15 minutes (rectal)
- Examples: sodium phosphate (and variants), magnesium citrate, magnesium hydroxide (milk of magnesia), and magnesium sulfate (Epsom salt)

=== Stimulant agents ===
Stimulant laxatives are substances that act on the intestinal mucosa or nerve plexus, altering water and electrolyte secretion. They also stimulate peristaltic action and can be dangerous under certain circumstances.

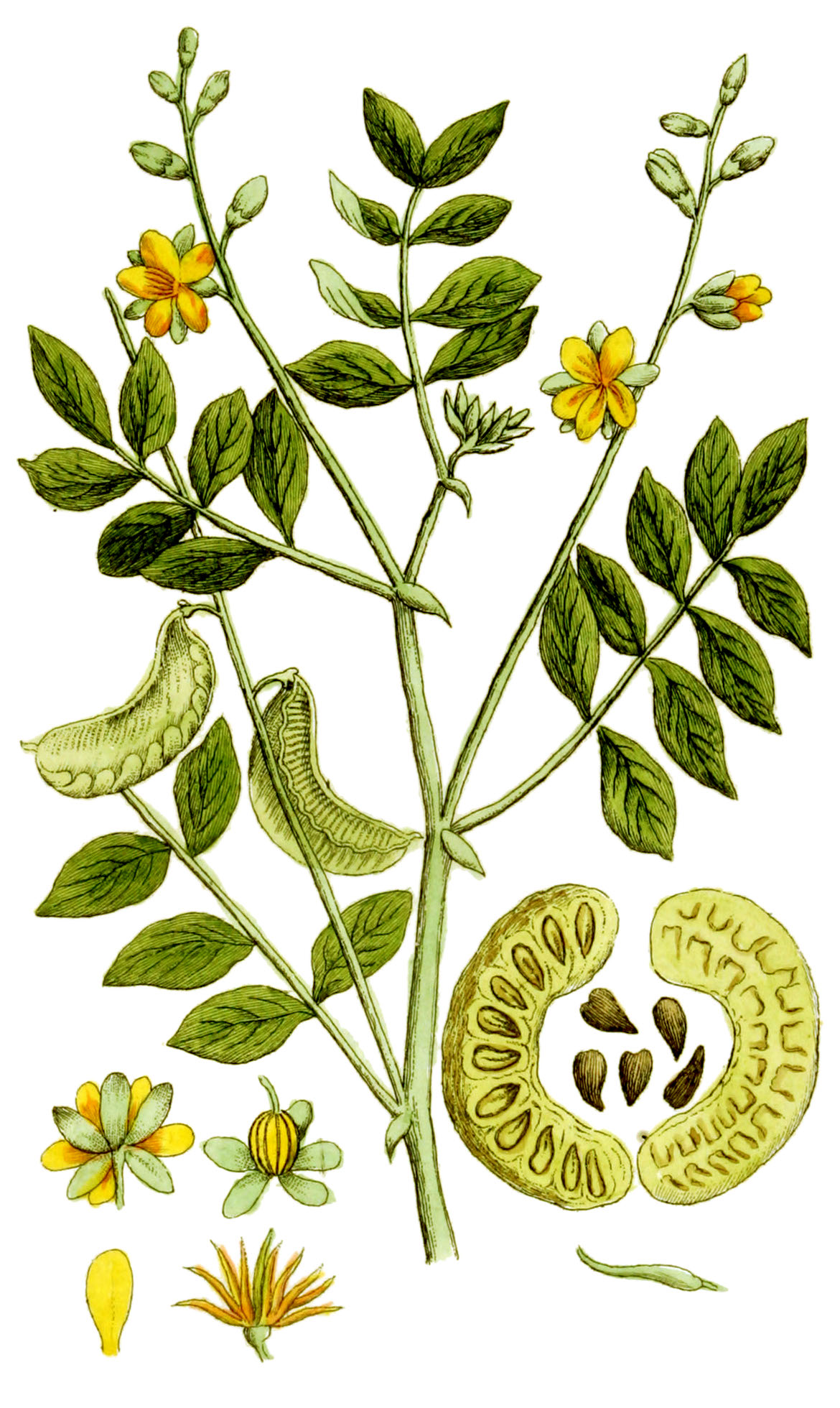
Senna plant

Properties

- Site of action: colon
- Onset of action: 6–10 hours
- Examples: senna, bisacodyl

=== Miscellaneous ===
Castor oil is a glyceride that is hydrolyzed by pancreatic lipase to ricinoleic acid, which produces laxative action by an unknown mechanism.

Properties

- Site of action: colon, small intestine (see below)
- Onset of action: 2–6 hours
- Examples: castor oil

Long-term use of castor oil may result in loss of fluid, electrolytes, and nutrients.

=== Serotonin agonist ===
These are motility stimulants that work through activation of 5-HT_{4} receptors of the enteric nervous system in the gastrointestinal tract. However, some have been discontinued or restricted due to potentially harmful cardiovascular side effects.

Tegaserod (brand name Zelnorm) was removed from the general U.S. and Canadian markets in 2007, due to reports of increased risks of heart attack or stroke. It is still available to physicians for patients in emergency situations that are life-threatening or require hospitalization.

Prucalopride (brand name Resolor) is a current drug approved for use in the EU since October 15, 2009, in Canada (brand name Resotran) since December 7, 2011, and in the United States since December 2018.

=== Chloride channel activators ===
Lubiprostone is used in the management of chronic idiopathic constipation and irritable bowel syndrome. It causes the intestines to produce a chloride-rich fluid secretion that softens the stool, increases motility, and promotes spontaneous bowel movements.

== Comparison of available agents ==
Common stimulant laxatives
Preparation(s)	Type	Site of action	Onset of action
Cascara (casanthranol)	Anthraquinone	colon	6–8 hours
Buckthorn	Anthraquinone	colon	6–8 hours
Senna extract (senna glycoside)	Anthraquinone	colon	6–8 hours
Aloe vera (aloin)	Anthraquinone	colon	8–10 hours
Phenolphthalein	Triphenylmethane	colon	8 hours
Bisacodyl (oral)	Triphenylmethane	colon	6–12 hours
Bisacodyl (suppository)	Triphenylmethane	colon	60 minutes
Castor oil	Ricinoleic acid	small intestine	2–6 hours

=== Effectiveness ===
For adults, a randomized controlled trial found PEG (MiraLax or GlycoLax) 17 grams once per day to be superior to tegaserod at 6 mg twice per day. A randomized controlled trial found greater improvement from two sachets (26 g) of PEG versus two sachets (20 g) of lactulose. 17 g per day of PEG has been effective and safe in a randomized, controlled trial for six months. Another randomized, controlled trial found no difference between sorbitol and lactulose.

For children, PEG was found to be more effective than lactulose.

== Problems with use ==
=== Laxative abuse ===
Some of the less significant adverse effects of laxative abuse include dehydration (which causes tremors, weakness, fainting, blurred vision, kidney damage), low blood pressure, fast heart rate, postural dizziness and fainting; however, laxative abuse can lead to potentially fatal acid-base, and electrolyte imbalances. For example, severe hypokalaemia has been associated with distal renal tubular acidosis from laxative abuse. Metabolic alkalosis is the most common acid-base imbalance observed. Other significant adverse effects include rhabdomyolysis, steatorrhoea, inflammation and ulceration of colonic mucosa, pancreatitis, kidney failure, factitious diarrhea and other problems. The colon will need more quantities of laxatives to keep functioning; this will result in a lazy colon, infections, irritable bowel syndrome, and potential liver damage.

Although some patients with eating disorders such as anorexia nervosa and bulimia nervosa abuse laxatives in an attempt to lose weight, laxatives act to speed up the transit of feces through the large intestine, which occurs after the absorption of nutrients in the small intestine is already complete. Thus, studies of laxative abuse have found that effects on body weight reflect primarily temporary losses of body water rather than energy (calorie) loss.

=== Laxative gut ===
Physicians warn against the chronic use of stimulant laxatives due to concern that chronic use could cause the colonic tissues to get worn out over time and not be able to expel feces due to long-term overstimulation. A common finding in patients having used stimulant laxatives is a brown pigment deposited in the intestinal tissue, known as melanosis coli.

== Historical and health fraud uses ==
Laxatives, once called "physicks" or "purgatives", were used extensively in historic medicine to treat many conditions for which they are now generally regarded as ineffective in evidence-based medicine. Likewise, laxatives (often termed colon cleanses) may be promoted in alternative medicine for various conditions of quackery, such as "mucoid plaque".

== See also ==
- ATC code A06
- Bowel management
- Cathartic
- Dietary fiber
- Diuretic
- Maltitol
- Enema
- Suppository
- Transanal irrigation
