= Bowel management =

- Specialty: Gastroenterology

Bowel management is the process which a person with a bowel disability uses to manage fecal incontinence or constipation. People who have a medical condition which impairs control of their defecation use bowel management techniques to choose a predictable time and place to evacuate. A simple bowel management technique might include diet control and establishing a toilet routine. As a more involved practice a person might use an enema to relieve themselves. Without bowel management, the person might either suffer from the feeling of not getting relief, or they might soil themselves.

Bowel control is often a challenge for children who are born with anomalies in their anus or rectum, Hirschsprung's disease, and/or spina bifida. Medical providers can help anyone with long term bowel problems to develop a routine in such cases to assist children in managing their bowels so that they can otherwise live normally.

== Overview ==
Bowel management is achieved mainly through a daily enema which empties the colon to prevent unwanted and uncontrolled bowel movements that day. Some patients also use laxatives and a controlled diet as part of their bowel management regimen. Another alternative is transanal irrigation.

Transanal irrigation of the rectum and colon is designed to assist the evacuation of faeces from the bowel by introducing water into rectum via the anus. By regularly emptying the bowel using transanal irrigation, controlled bowel function is often re-established to a high degree in patients with bowel incontinence and/or constipation. This enables the users to develop a consistent bowel routine by choosing the time and place of evacuation. An international consensus on when and how to use transanal irrigation for people with bowel problems was published 2013. The article offers practitioners a clear, comprehensive and simple guide to practice for the emerging therapeutic area of transanal irrigation.

Determining the appropriate regimen to achieve successful bowel management is done under medical supervision. Care is tailored to suit each child and often requires a trial and error approach over the course of a week. The patient has an X-ray taken which is reviewed by their doctor. The doctor then recommends a course of action (e.g. enemas, laxative, and/or controlled diet). The next day, the process is repeated with modifications to help the child achieve a completely empty colon. After the course of this week the doctor can determine the precise amount and combination of what the child needs to achieve bowel management. From then on the patient can continue the regimen on their own.

Bowel management does not cure fecal incontinence, but can greatly increase quality of life. With successful bowel management, a child may be more apt to establish independence in normal daily life. Children with severe incontinence may also be able to attend school and participate in activities they otherwise would never be able to.

Depending on the prognosis, some patients will continue using these techniques for life while others may gain some degree of bowel control and become "potty trained". Children who practice bowel management often become unhappy as they age, especially at puberty, due to feeling that the administration of enemas is an intrusion on their privacy, especially as it is difficult for them to administer the enema themselves. An operation called a continent appendicostomy or Malone procedure is available. This allows a person to give themselves an enema by inserting a catheter into a small orifice at the navel.

== Fecal incontinence ==
The medical definition of fecal incontinence is the incapacity to voluntarily hold feces in the rectum. There are two subgroups to those with fecal incontinence: real fecal incontinence and pseudoincontinence.

=== Real fecal incontinence ===
For a child with real fecal incontinence, the normal mechanism of bowel control is not working. An alteration of the muscles that surround the anorectal canal along with poor sphincters (the muscles that control the anus) are responsible for fecal incontinence in children operated on for anorectal malformations with a bad prognosis. Some patients operated on for Hirschsprung's disease have this anatomic problem as do those with spinal problems. The supply of nerve connections of these muscles is important for their correct function. A deficit of nerve connections occurs in anorectal anomalies as well as in other conditions. In cases of spina bifida, or following spinal cord injury, the contraction and relaxation of the muscles, as well as sensation, are deficient. The presence and the passage of feces and the perception of the difference between solid and liquid feces and gas are limited.

=== Pseudoincontinence ===
In cases of pseudoincontinence, a child is believed to have fecal incontinence. However, investigation shows that they have severe constipation and fecal impaction. When the impaction is treated and the patient receives enough laxatives to pass stool, they become continent.

== Candidates for bowel management ==
Children who have fecal incontinence after the repair of an imperforate anus are usually those born with a bad prognosis type of defect and severe associated defects (defect of the sacrum, poor muscle complex). However, such children can still achieve a good quality of life when treated with the bowel management program. Children operated on for imperforate anus and who have fecal incontinence can be divided into two groups that require individualized treatment plans:

Children with constipation (colonic hypomotility): No special diet or medications are necessary for children with colonic hypomotility, a type of constipation. Their tendency towards constipation helps them to remain clean between enemas. The real challenge is to find an enema capable of cleaning the colon completely. Soiling episodes or "accidents" occur when there is an incomplete cleaning of the bowel.

Children with loose stools and diarrhea (colonic hypermotility): This group of children has an overactive colon. Rapid transit of stool results in frequent episodes of diarrhea. This means that even when an enema cleans the colon rather easily, stool keeps on passing fairly quickly from the cecum to the descending colon and the anus. To prevent this, a constipating diet and/or medications to slow down the colon are necessary. Eliminating foods that further loosen bowel movements will help the colon to slow down. Those who experience hypermotility may have to follow a constipating diet and avoid laxative foods. The diet is rigid and includes food such as banana, apple, baked bread, white pasta with no sauce, boiled meat, and others, while fried foods and dairy products are avoided.
