= Enema =

Fluid injection into the large intestine

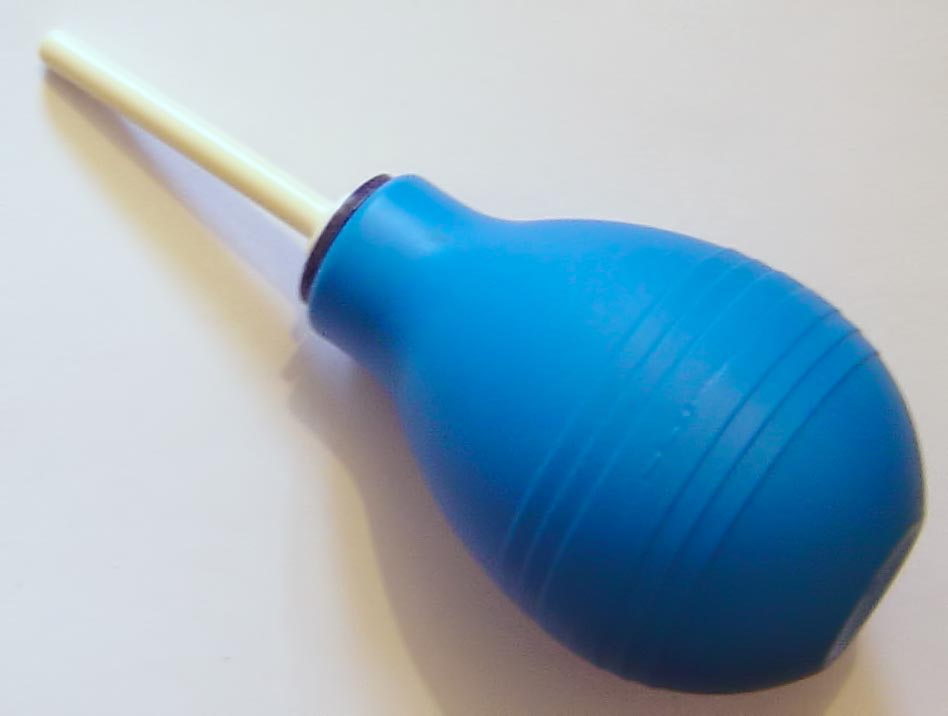
Rectal bulb syringe to administer smaller enemas

An enema, also known as a clyster, is the rectal administration of a fluid by injection into the lower bowel via the anus. The word enema can also refer to the liquid injected, as well as to a device for administering such an injection.

In standard medicine, the most frequent uses of enemas are to relieve constipation and for bowel cleansing before a medical examination or procedure; also, they are employed as a lower gastrointestinal series (also called a barium enema), to treat traveler's diarrhea, as a vehicle for the administration of food, water or medicine, as a stimulant to the general system, as a local application and, more rarely, as a means of reducing body temperature, as treatment for encopresis, and as a form of rehydration therapy (proctoclysis) in patients for whom intravenous therapy is not applicable.

== Medical usage ==
The principal medical usages of enemas are:

=== Bowel cleansing ===
==== Acute treatments ====
As bowel stimulants, enemas are employed for the same purposes as orally administered laxatives: to relieve constipation; to treat fecal impaction; to empty the colon before a medical procedure such as a colonoscopy. When oral laxatives are not indicated or sufficiently effective, enemas may be a sensible and necessary measure.

A large volume enema can be given to cleanse as much of the colon as possible of feces. However, a low enema is generally useful only for stool in the rectum, not in the intestinal tract.

Such enemas’ mechanism consists of the volume of the liquid causing a rapid expansion of the intestinal tract in conjunction with, in the case of certain solutions, irritation of the intestinal mucosa which stimulates peristalsis and lubricates the stool to encourage a bowel movement. An enema’s efficacy depends on several factors including the volume injected and the temperature and the contents of the infusion. For the enema to be effective, the patient should retain the solution for five to ten minutes, as tolerated, or, as some nursing textbooks recommend, for five to fifteen minutes or as long as possible.

===== Large volume enemas =====
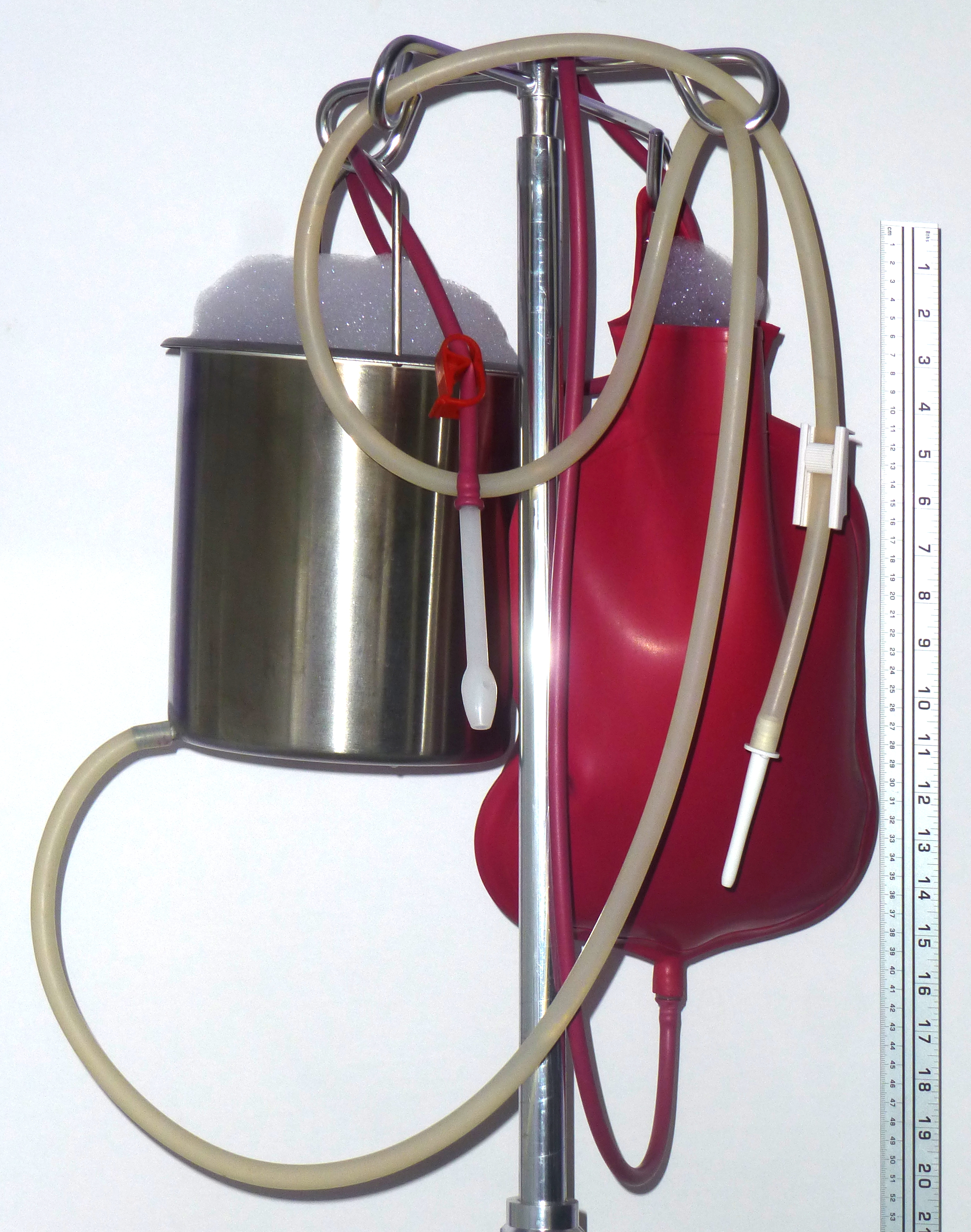
Soapsuds enemas, one in an enema bucket with a nozzle typical for a cleansing enema, and another in an enema bag with a nozzle typical for a contrast enema

For emptying the entire colon as much as feasible deeper and higher enemas are utilized to reach large colon sections. The colon dilates and expands when a large volume of liquid is injected into it. The colon reacts to that sudden expansion with general contractions, peristalsis, propelling its contents toward the rectum.

Soapsuds enema is a frequently used synonym for a large volume enema (although soap is not necessary for effectiveness).

A large volume enema may be used in a home setting to relieve occasional constipation, although medical care may be required for recurring or severe cases of constipation.

====== Water-based solutions ======
Plain water can be used, functioning mechanically to expand the colon, thus prompting evacuation.

Normal saline is least irritating to the colon. Like plain water, it simply functions mechanically to expand the colon, but having a neutral concentration gradient, it neither draws electrolytes from the body, as happens with plain water, nor draws water into the colon, as occurs with phosphates. Thus, a salt water solution can be used when a longer retention period is desired, such as to soften an impaction.

Castile soap is commonly added because its irritation of the colon’s lining increases the defecation urgency. However, liquid handsoaps and detergents should not be used.

Glycerol is a specific bowel mucosa irritant serving to induce peristalsis via a hyperosmotic effect. It is used in a dilute solution, e.g., 5 %.

====== Other solutions ======
Equal parts of milk and molasses were heated to slightly above normal body temperature. Neither the milk sugars and proteins nor the molasses are absorbed in the lower intestine, thus keeping the water from the enema in the intestine. Studies have shown that milk and molasses enemas have a low complication rate when used in the emergency department and are safe and effective with minimal side effects.

Mineral oil functions as a lubricant and stool softener, but may have side effects including rectal skin irritation and oil leakage.

===== Micro-enemas =====
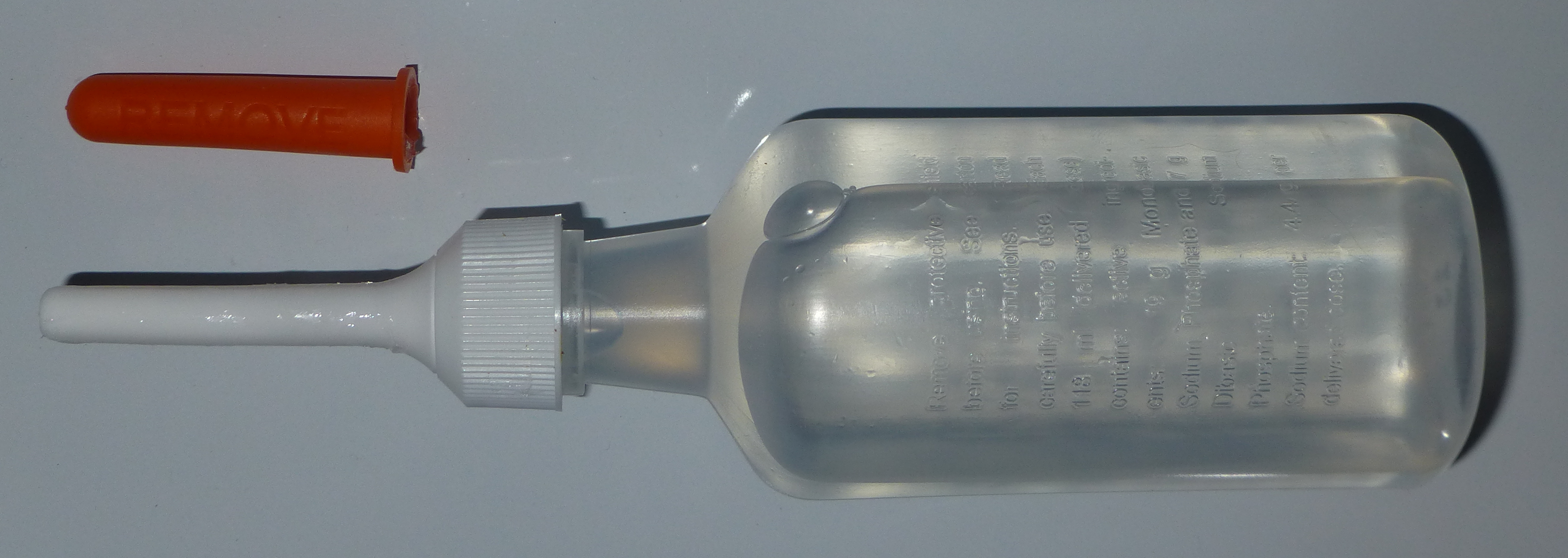
A prepared, disposable enema

====== ATC codes for drugs for constipation — enemas ======
ATC code A06 Drugs for constipation is a therapeutic subgroup of the Anatomical Therapeutic Chemical Classification System, a system of alphanumeric codes developed by the World Health Organization (WHO) for the classification of drugs and other medical products. Subgroup A06 is part of the anatomical group A Alimentary tract and metabolism.

Codes for veterinary use (ATCvet codes) can be created by placing the letter Q in front of the human ATC code: for example, QA06.
National versions of the ATC classification may include additional codes not present in this list, which follows the WHO version.

A06AG01 Sodium phosphate
A06AG02 Bisacodyl
A06AG03 Dantron, including combinations
A06AG04 Glycerol
A06AG06 Oil
A06AG07 Sorbitol
A06AG10 Docusate sodium, including combinations
A06AG11 Sodium lauryl sulfoacetate, including combinations
A06AG20 Combinations

====== Single substance solutions ======
In alphabetical order

- Arachis oil (peanut oil) enema is useful for softening stools which are impacted higher than the rectum.
- Bisacodyl stimulates enteric nerves to cause colonic contractions.
- Dantron is a stimulant drug and stool softener used alone or in combinations in enemas. Considered to be a carcinogen its use is limited, e.g., restricted in the UK to patients who already have a diagnosis of terminal cancer and not used at all in the USA.
- Docusate
- Glycerol has a hyperosmotic effect and can be used as a small-volume (2–10 ml) enema (or suppository).
- Mineral oil is used as a lubricant because most of the ingested material is excreted in the stool rather than absorbed by the body.
- Sodium phosphate. Also known by the brand name Fleet. Available at drugstores; usually self-administered. Buffered sodium phosphate solution draws additional water from the bloodstream into the colon to increase the effectiveness of the enema. But it can irritate the colon, causing intense cramping or "griping." Fleet enemas usually cause a bowel movement in 1 to 5 minutes. Many companies, such as CVS, make a version of this type of enema at a lower price than Fleet. The average cost of the CVS house brand enema as of August 2026 is $3.29 for a two-pack. The average cost for a single Fleet enema is $6.79.
- Sorbitol pulls water into the large intestines, causing distention, stimulating the bowels' normal forward movement. Sorbitol is found in some dried fruits and may contribute to the laxative effects of prunes. and is available for taking orally as a laxative. As an enema for constipation, the recommended adult dose is 120 mL of 25-30% solution, administered once. Note that Sorbitol is an ingredient of the Microlax enema.

====== Compounded from multiple ingredients ======
In alphabetical order of the original brand names

Klyx contains docusate sodium 1 mg/mL and sorbitol solution (70 %)(crystallising) 357 mg/mL and is used for faecal impaction or constipation or colon evacuation prior medical procedures, developed by Ferring B.V.

Micralax (not to be confused with Microlax)

Microlax (not to be confused with Micralax) combines the action of sodium citrate, a peptidising agent which can displace bound water present in the faeces, with sodium alkyl sulphoacetate, a wetting agent, and with glycerol, an anal mucosa irritant and hyperosmotic. However, also sold under the name “Micralax,” is a preparation containing sorbitol rather than glycerol; which was initially tested in preparation for sigmoidoscopy.

Micolette Micro-enema contains 45 mg sodium lauryl sulphoacetate, 450 mg per 5 ml sodium citrate BP, and 625 mg glycerol BP and is a small volume stimulant enema suitable where large-volume enemas are contra-indicated.

==== Chronic treatments ====
===== Transanal irrigation =====
TAI, also termed retrograde irrigation, is designed to assist evacuation using a water enema as a treatment for persons with bowel dysfunction, including fecal incontinence or constipation, especially obstructed defecation. By regularly emptying the bowel using transanal irrigation, controlled bowel function is often re-established to a high degree, thus enabling a consistent bowel routine development. Its effectiveness varies considerably, some individuals experiencing complete control of incontinence but others reporting little or no benefit.

An international consensus on when and how to use transanal irrigation for people with bowel problems was published in 2013, offering practitioners a clear, comprehensive and straightforward guide to practice for the emerging therapeutic area of transanal irrigation.

The term retrograde irrigation distinguishes this procedure from the Malone antegrade continence enema, where irrigation fluid is introduced into the colon proximal to the anus via a surgically created irrigation port.

===== Bowel management =====
Patients who have a bowel disability, a medical condition which impairs control of defecation, e.g., fecal incontinence or constipation, can use bowel management techniques to choose a predictable time and place to evacuate. Without bowel management, such persons might either suffer from the feeling of not getting relief or soil themselves.

While simple techniques might include a controlled diet and establishing a toilet routine, a daily enema can be taken to empty the colon, thus preventing unwanted and uncontrolled bowel movements that day.

=== Contrast (X-ray) ===
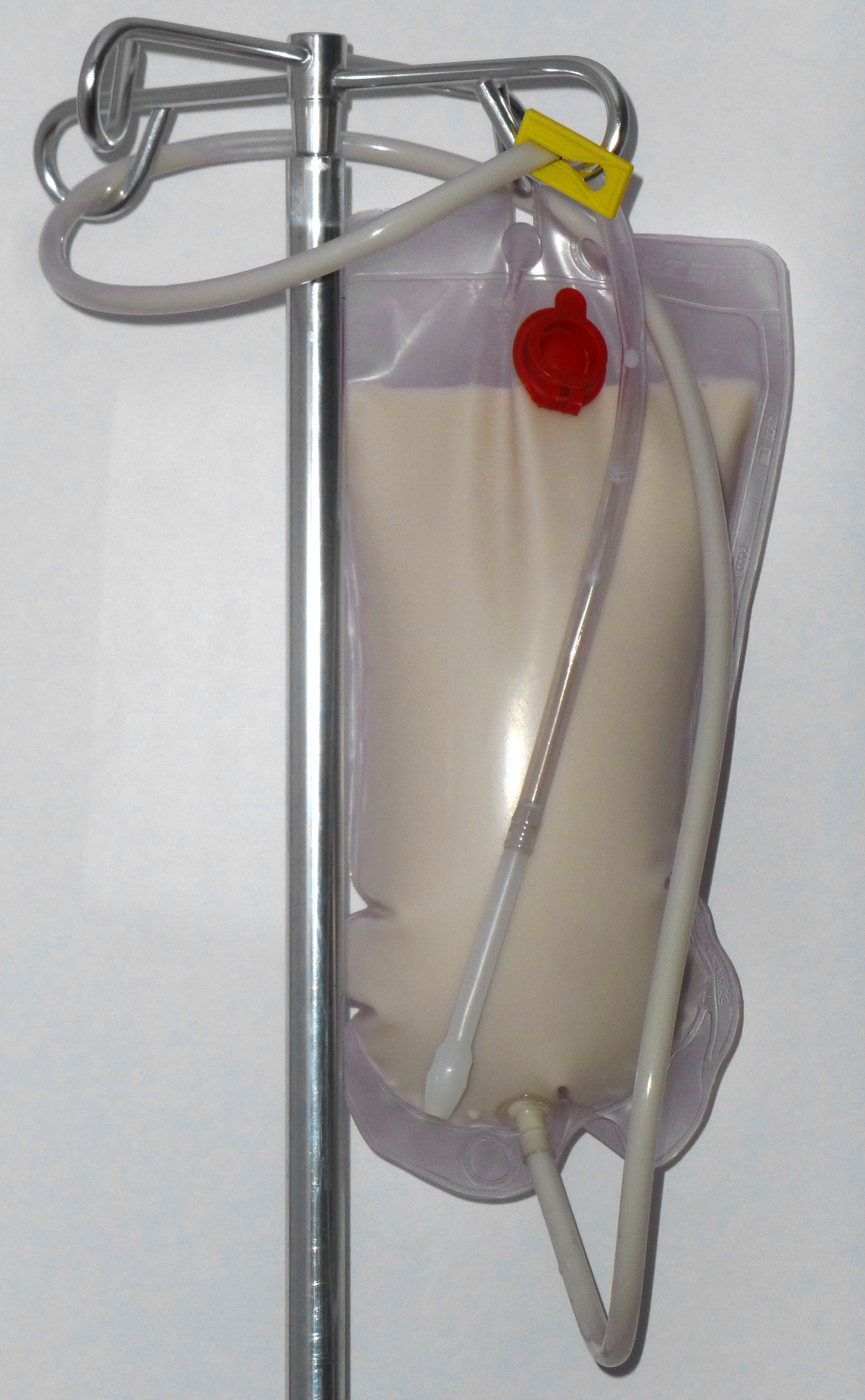
A barium enema in a disposable bag manufactured for X-ray contrast

In a lower gastrointestinal series an enema that may contain barium sulfate powder or a water-soluble contrast agent is used in the radiological imaging of the bowel. Called a barium enema, such enemas are sometimes the only practical way to view the colon relatively safely.

Failure to expel all of the barium may cause constipation or possible impaction and a patient who has no bowel movement for more than two days or is unable to pass gas rectally should promptly inform a physician and may require an enema or laxative.

=== Medication administration ===
The administration of substances into the bloodstream. This may be done in situations where it is undesirable or impossible to deliver a medication by mouth, such as antiemetics given to reduce nausea (though not many antiemetics are delivered by enema). Additionally, several anti-angiogenic agents, which work better without digestion, can be safely administered via a gentle enema.

Topical administration of medications into the rectum, such as corticosteroids and mesalazine, is used in the treatment of inflammatory bowel disease. Administration by enema avoids having the medication pass through the entire gastrointestinal tract, therefore simplifying the delivery of the medication to the affected area and limiting the amount that is absorbed into the bloodstream.

Rectal corticosteroid enemas are sometimes used to treat mild or moderate ulcerative colitis. They may also be used along with systemic (oral or injection) corticosteroids or other medicines to treat severe disease or mild to moderate disease that has spread too far to be effectively treated by medicine inserted into the rectum alone.

=== Inhibiting pathological defecation ===
- Traveller's diarrhea's symptoms treated with an enema of sodium butyrate, organic acids, and A-300 silicon dioxide can be successfully decreased with lack of observed side effects.
- Shigellosis treatment benefits from adjunct therapy with butyrate enemas, promoting healing of the rectal mucosa and inflammation, but not helping in clinical recovery from shigellosis. Use of an 80 ml of a sodium butyrate isotonic enema administered every 12 hours has been studied and found effective.

=== Other ===
- There have been a few cases in remote or rural settings, where rectal fluids have been used to rehydrate a person. Benefits include not needing to use sterile fluids.
- Introducing healthy bacterial flora through infusion of stool, known as a fecal microbiota transplant, was first performed in 1958 employing retention enemas. Enemas remained the most common method until 1989, when alternative administration means were developed. As of 2013, colonoscope implantation has been preferred over fecal enemas because by using the former method, the entire colon and ileum can be inoculated, but enemas reach only to the splenic flexure.
- A patient unable to be fed otherwise can be nourished by an enteral administration of predigested foods, which is known as a nutrient enema. This treatment is ancient, dating back at least to the second century CE when documented by Galen, and commonly used in the Middle Ages, remaining a common technique in 19th century, and as recently as 1941 the U. S. military's manual for hospital diets prescribes their use. Nutrient enemas have been superseded in modern medical care by tube feeding and intravenous feeding.
- Enemas have been used around the time of childbirth; however, there is no evidence that this practice is beneficial and it is now discouraged. It was thought at one time it was benefical to clean the bowels of the woman giving birth.

== Adverse effects ==
Improper administration of an enema can cause electrolyte imbalance (with repeated enemas) or ruptures to the bowel or rectal tissues which can be unnoticed as the rectum is insensitive to pain, resulting in internal bleeding. However, these occurrences are rare in healthy, sober adults. Internal bleeding or rupture may expose the individual to infections from intestinal bacteria. Blood resulting from tears in the colon may not always be visible, but can be distinguished if the feces are unusually dark or have a red hue. If intestinal rupture is suspected, medical assistance should be obtained immediately. Frequent use of enemas can cause laxative dependency.

The enema tube and solution may stimulate the vagus nerve, which may trigger an arrhythmia such as bradycardia.

Enemas should not be used if there is an undiagnosed abdominal pain since the peristalsis of the bowel can cause an inflamed appendix to rupture.

There are arguments both for and against colonic irrigation in people with diverticulitis, ulcerative colitis, Crohn's disease, severe or internal hemorrhoids or tumors in the rectum or colon. Its usage is not recommended soon after bowel surgery (unless directed by one's health care provider). Regular treatments should be avoided by people with heart disease or kidney failure. Colonics are inappropriate for people with bowel, rectal or anal pathologies where the pathology contributes to the risk of bowel perforation.

Recent research has shown that ozone water, which is sometimes used in enemas, can immediately cause microscopic colitis.

A recent case series of 11 patients with five deaths illustrated the danger of phosphate enemas in high-risk patients.

== History ==
=== Etymology ===
Enema entered the English language c. 1675 from Latin in which, in the 15th century, it was first used in the sense of a rectal injection, from Greek ἔνεμα (énema), "injection", itself from ἐνιέναι (enienai) "to send in, inject", from ἐν (en), "in" + ἱέναι (hienai), "to send, throw".

Clyster entered the English language in the late 14th century from Old French or Latin, from Greek κλυστήρ (klyster), "syringe", itself from κλύζειν (klyzein), "to wash out", also spelled glister in the 18th century. It is a generally archaic word used more particularly for enemas administered using a clyster syringe.

=== Ancient and medieval ===
==== Africa ====
The first mention of the enema in medical literature is in the Ancient Egyptian Ebers Papyrus (c. 1550 BCE). One of the many types of medical specialists was a Nery-Pehuyt, the Shepherd of the Anus. Enemas administered many medications. There was a Keeper of the Royal Rectum who may have primarily been the pharaoh's enema maker. According to Egyptian mythology, the god Thoth invented the enema.

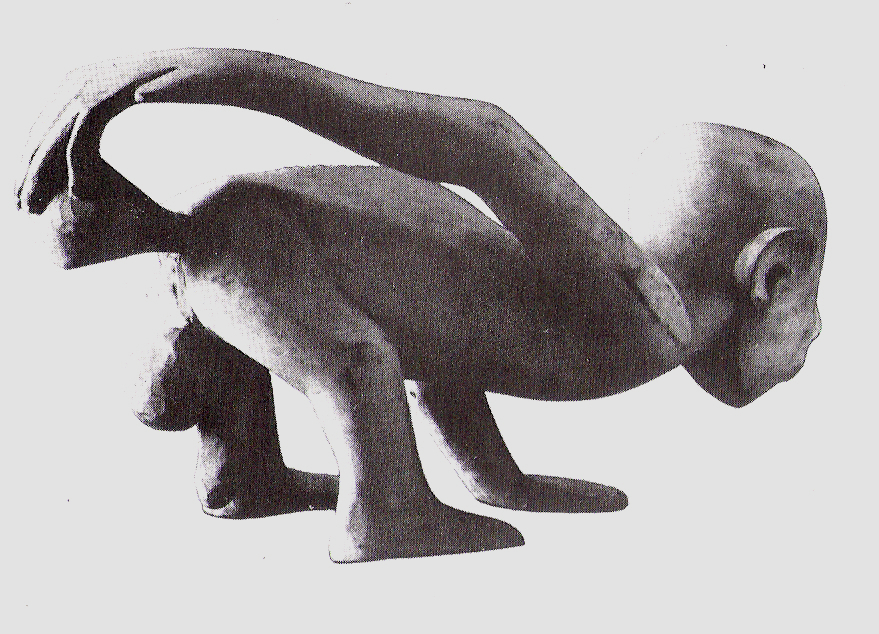
Pressure enema from an animal bladder (African wooden sculpture, 19th century)

In parts of Africa, the calabash gourd is used traditionally to administer enemas. On the Ivory Coast the narrow neck of the gourd filled with water is inserted the patient's rectum and the contents are then injected by means of an attendant's forcible oral inflation, or a patient may self-administer the enema by using suction to create a negative pressure in the gourd, placing a finger at the opening, and then upon anal insertion, removing the finger to allow atmospheric pressure to effect the flow. In South Africa, Bhaca people used an ox horn to administer enemas. Along the upper Congo River an enema apparatus is made by making a hole in one end of the gourd for filling it, and using a resin to attach a hollow cane to the gourd's neck. The cane is inserted into the anus of the patient who is in a posture that allows gravity to effect infusion of the fluid.

==== Americas ====
The Olmec used trance-inducing substances ceremonially from their middle preclassic period (10th through 7th centuries BCE) through the Spanish Conquest. These were ingested via enemas administered using jars, among other routes.

As further described below in religious rituals, the Maya in their late classic age (7th through 10th centuries CE) used enemas for, at least, ritual purposes, Mayan sculpture and ceramics from that period depicting scenes in which, injected by syringes made of gourd and clay, ritual hallucinogenic enemas were taken. In the Xibalban court of the God D, whose worship included ritual cult paraphernal, the Maya illustrated the use of a characteristic enema bulb syringe by female attendants administering clysters ritually.

For combating illness and discomfort of the digestive tract, the Mayan also employed enemas, as documented during the colonial period, e.g., in the Florentine Codex.

The indigenous peoples of North America employed tobacco smoke enemas to stimulate respiration, injecting the smoke using a rectal tube.

A rubber bag connected with a conical nozzle, at an early period, was in use among the indigenous peoples of South America as an enema syringe, and the rubber enema bag with a connecting tube and ivory tip remained in use by them; in contrast, in Europe a syringe was still the usual means for conducting an enema.

==== Asia ====
In Babylonia, by 600 BCE, enemas were in use. However, it appears that initially they were in use because of a belief that the demon of disease would be driven out of the body by utilizing an enema. Babylonian and Assyrian tablets c. 600 BCE bear cuneiform inscriptions referring to enemas.

In China, c. 200 CE, Zhang Zhongjing was the first to employ enemas. "Secure a large pig's bile and mix with a small quantity of vinegar. Insert a bamboo tube three or four inches long into the rectum and inject the mixture" are his directions, according to Wu Lien-teh.

In India, in the fifth century BCE, Sushruta enumerates the enema syringe among 121 surgical instruments described. Early Indian physicians' enema apparatus consisted of a tube of bamboo, ivory, or horn attached to the scrotum of a deer, goat, or ox.

In Persia, Avicenna (980–1037 A. D.) is credited with the introduction of the "clyster-purse" or collapsible portion of an enema outfit made from ox skin or silk cloth and emptied by squeezing with the hands.

==== Europe ====
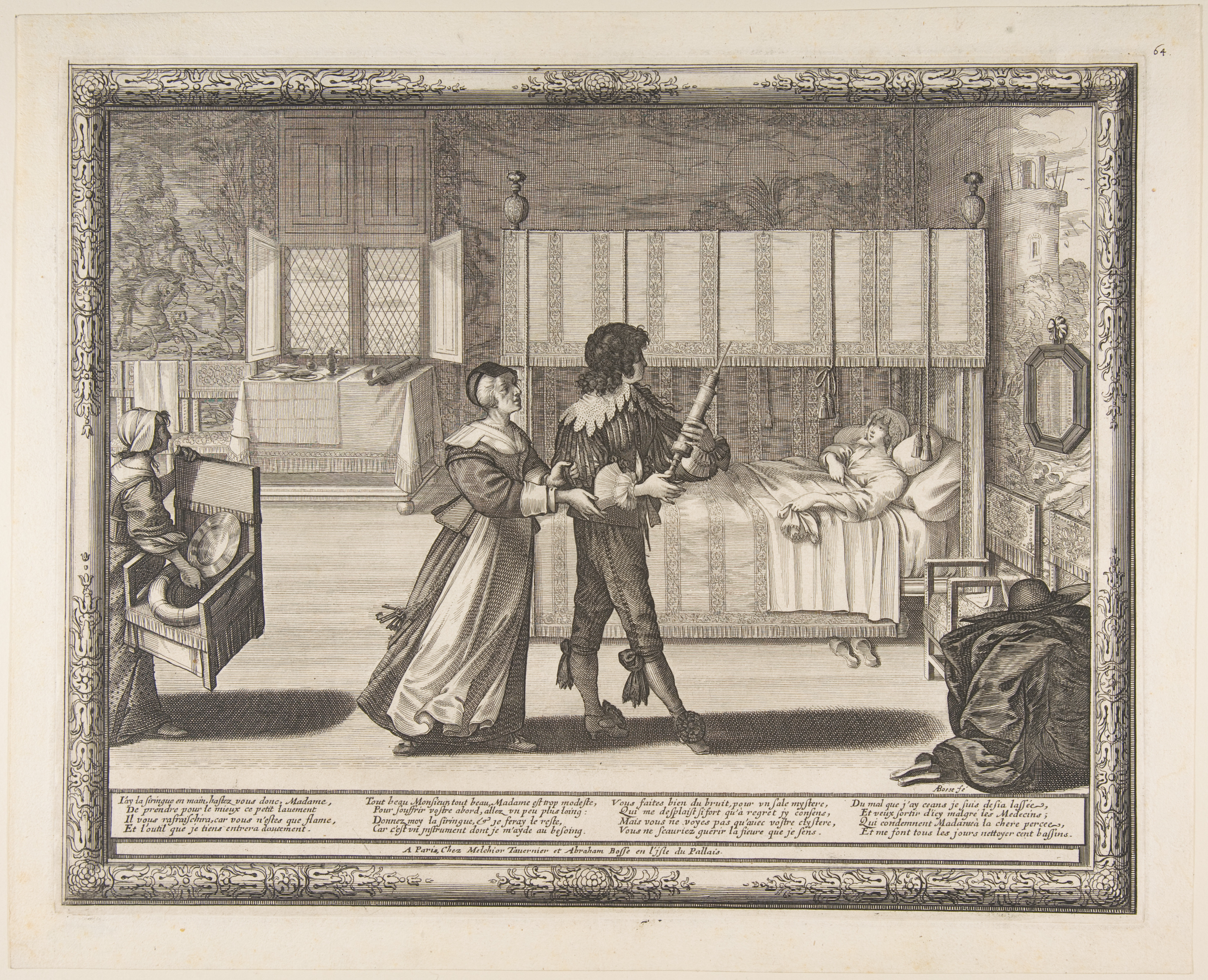
The Enema by Abraham Bosse, ca. 1632–33

Hippocrates (460–370 BCE) frequently mentions enemas, e.g., "if the previous food which the patient has recently eaten should not have gone down, give an enema if the patient be strong and in the prime of life, but if he be weak, a suppository should be administered, should the bowels be not well moved on their own accord."

In the first century BCE the Greek physician Asclepiades of Bithynia wrote, “Treatment consists merely of three elements: drink, food, and the enema.” Also, he contended that indigestion is caused by particles of food that are too big and his prescribed treatment was proper amounts of food and wine followed by an enema which would remove the improper food doing the damage.

In the second century CE the Greek physician Soranus prescribed, among other techniques, enemas as a safe abortion method, and the Greek philosopher Celsus recommended an enema of pearl barley in milk or rose oil with butter as a nutrient for those with dysentery and unable to eat, and also Galen mentions enemas in several contexts.

In medieval times appear the first illustrations of enema equipment in the Western world, a clyster syringe consisting of a tube attached to a pump action bulb made of a pig bladder. A simple piston syringe clyster was used from the 15th through 19th centuries. This device had its rectal nozzle connected to a syringe with a plunger rather than to a bulb.

=== Modern Western ===
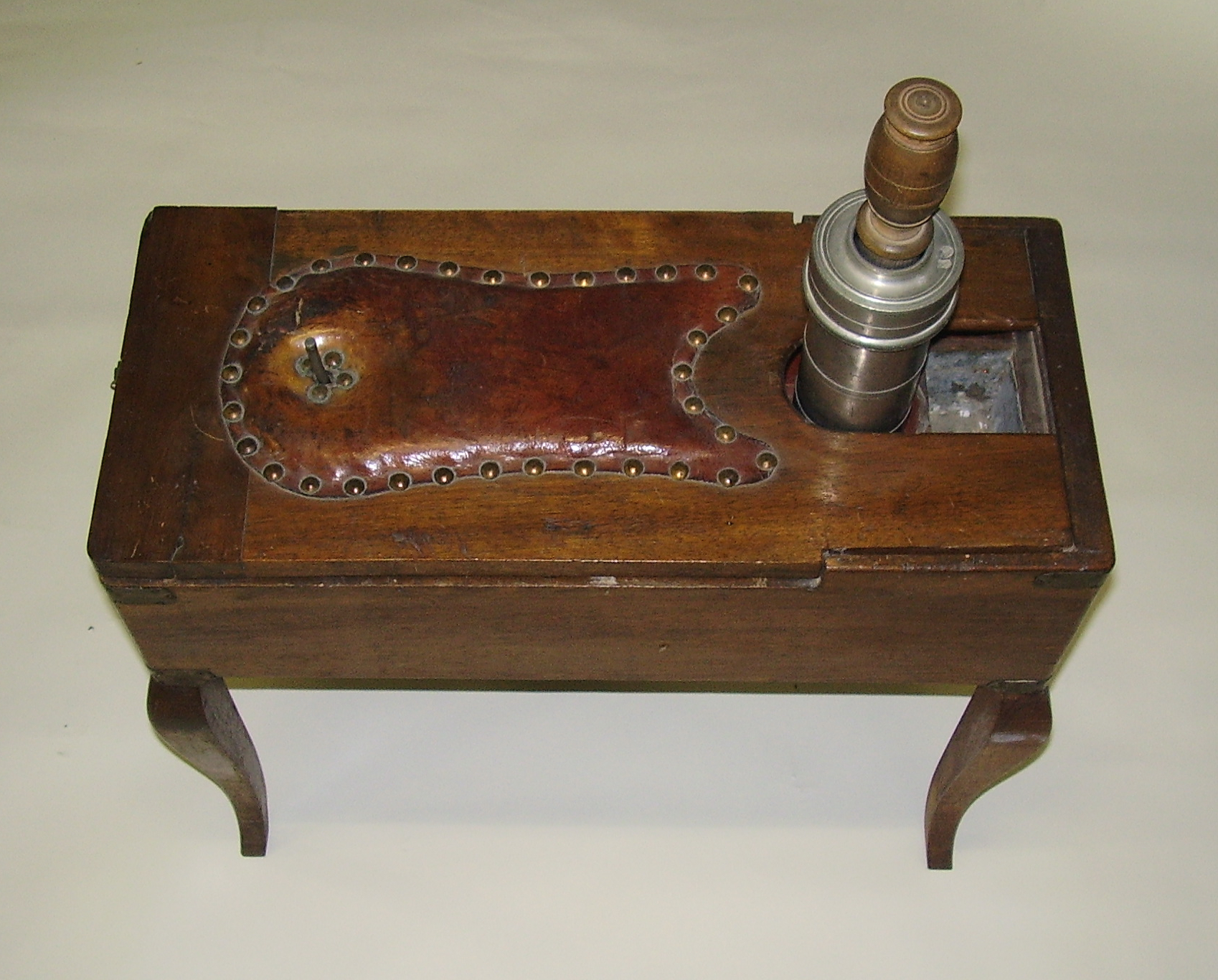
Portable enema self-administration apparatus by Giovanni Alessandro Brambilla (18th century; Medical History Museum, University of Zurich)

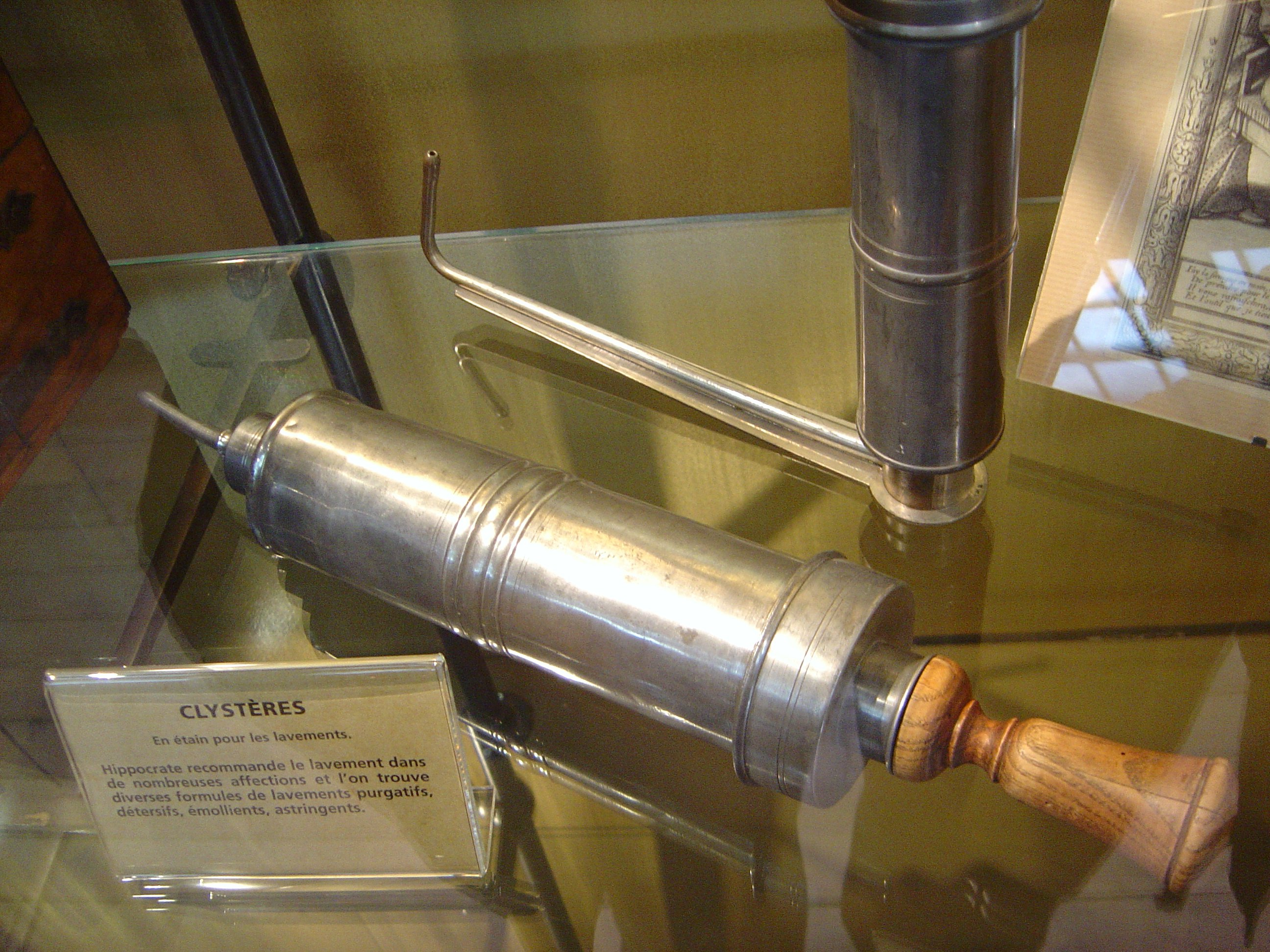
A normal clyster syringe (front) and the nozzle for a syringe designed for self-administration (rear). The latter avoided the need for a second party to attend an embarrassing procedure.

Beginning in the 17th century, enema apparatus was chiefly designed for self-administration at home, and many were French as enemas enjoyed wide usage in France.

In 1694 François Mauriceau in his early-modern treatise, The Diseases of Women with Child, records midwives and man-midwives commonly administered clysters to labouring mothers just before their delivery.

Clysters were administered for symptoms of constipation and, with more questionable effectiveness, stomach aches and other illnesses.

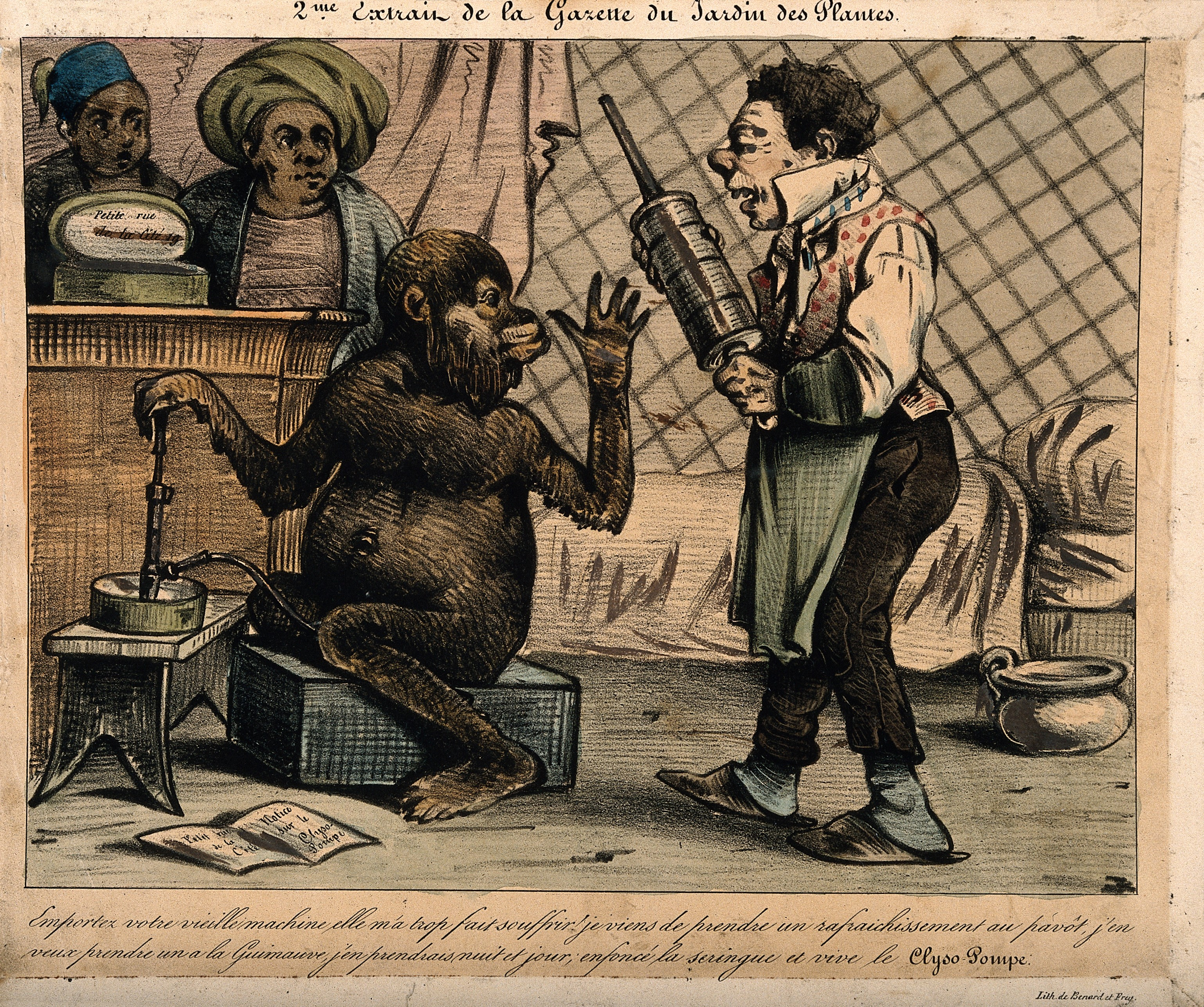
19th century satirical cartoon of a monkey rejecting an old style clyster for a new design, filled with marshmallow and opium

In 1753, Johann Jacob Woyts described an enema bag prepared from a pig's or beef's bladder attached to a tube as an alternative to a syringe.

In the 18th century Europeans began emulating the indigenous peoples of North America's use of tobacco smoke enemas to resuscitate drowned people. Tobacco resuscitation kits consisting of a pair of bellows and a tube were provided by the Royal Humane Society of London and placed at various points along the Thames. Furthermore, these enemas came to be employed for headaches, respiratory failure, colds, hernias, abdominal cramps, typhoid fever, and cholera outbreaks.

Clysters were a favourite medical treatment in the bourgeoisie and nobility of the Western world up to the 19th century. As medical knowledge was fairly limited at the time, purgative clysters were used for a wide variety of ailments, the foremost of which were stomach aches and constipation.

According to the duc de Saint-Simon, clysters were so popular at the court of King Louis XIV of France that the duchess of Burgundy had her servant give her a clyster in front of the King (her modesty being preserved by an adequate posture) before going to the comedy. However, he also mentions the astonishment of the King and Mme de Maintenon that she should take it before them.

In the 19th century, many new types of enema administration equipment were devised. Devices allowing gravity to infuse the solution, like those mentioned above used by South American indigenous people and like the enema bag described by Johann Jacob Woyts, came into common use. These consist of a nozzle at the end of a hose that connects a reservoir, either a bucket or a rubber bag filled with liquid and held or hung above the recipient.

In the early 20th century the disposable microenema, a squeeze bottle, was invented by Charles Browne Fleet.

== Society and culture ==
=== Alternative medicine ===
==== Relatively benign ====
===== Colonic irrigation =====
The term "colonic irrigation" is commonly used in gastroenterology to refer to the practice of introducing water through a colostomy or a surgically constructed conduit as a treatment for constipation. The Food and Drug Administration has ruled that colonic irrigation equipment is not approved for sale for general well-being and has taken action against many distributors of this equipment, including a Warning Letter.

===== Colon cleansing =====
The same term is also used in alternative medicine where it may involve the use of substances mixed with water to detoxify the body. Practitioners believe the accumulation of fecal matter in the large intestine leads to ill health. This resurrects the old medical concept of autointoxication which was orthodox doctrine until the end of the 19th century but has now been discredited.

===== Kellogg's enemas =====
In the late 19th century, Dr. John Harvey Kellogg made sure that every patient's bowel was plied with water, from above and below. His favorite device was an enema machine ("just like one I saw in Germany") that could run fifteen gallons of water through a person's bowel in seconds. Every water enema was followed by a pint of yogurt—half was eaten, the other half was administered by enema "thus planting the protective germs where they are most needed and may render most effective service." The yogurt served to replace "the intestinal flora" of the bowel, creating what Kellogg claimed was a completely clean intestine.

==== Dangerous ====
===== Bleach enemas =====
Chlorine dioxide enemas have been fraudulently marketed as a medical treatment, primarily for autism. This has resulted, for example, in a six-year-old boy needing to have his colon removed and a colostomy bag fitted, complaints to the FDA reporting life-threatening reactions, and even death.

Proponents falsely claim that administering enemas to autistic children results in the expulsion of parasitic worms ("rope worms"), which are actually fragments of damaged intestinal epithelium that are misinterpreted as being human pathogens. Oral and rectal use of the solution has also been promoted as a cure for HIV, malaria, viral hepatitis, influenza, common colds, acne, cancer, Parkinson's, and much more.

Chlorine dioxide is a potent and toxic bleach that is relabeled for "medicinal purposes" to a variety of brand names including, but not limited to, MMS, Miracle Mineral Supplement, and CD protocol. For oral use, the doses recommended on the labeling can cause nausea, vomiting, diarrhea, and potentially life-threatening dehydration.

No clinical trials have been performed to test the health claims made for chlorine dioxide, which originate from former Scientologist Jim Humble in his 2006 self-published book, The Miracle Mineral Solution of the 21st Century and from anecdotal reports. Humble coined the name MMS. Sellers sometimes describe MMS as a water purifier to circumvent medical regulations. The International Federation of Red Cross and Red Crescent Societies rejected “in the strongest terms” reports by promoters of MMS that they had used the product to fight malaria.

===== Coffee enemas =====
Well documented as having no proven benefits and considered by medical authorities as rash and potentially dangerous is an enema of coffee.

A coffee enema can cause numerous maladies including infections, sepsis (including campylobacter sepsis), severe electrolyte imbalance, colitis, polymicrobial enteric sepsis, proctocolitis, salmonella, brain abscess, and heart failure, and deaths related to coffee enemas have been documented.

Gerson therapy includes administering enemas of coffee, as well as of castor oil and sometimes of hydrogen peroxide or of ozone.

Some proponents of alternative medicine have claimed that coffee enemas have an anti-cancer effect by "detoxifying" metabolic products of tumors but there is no medical scientific evidence to support this.

=== Recreational usage ===
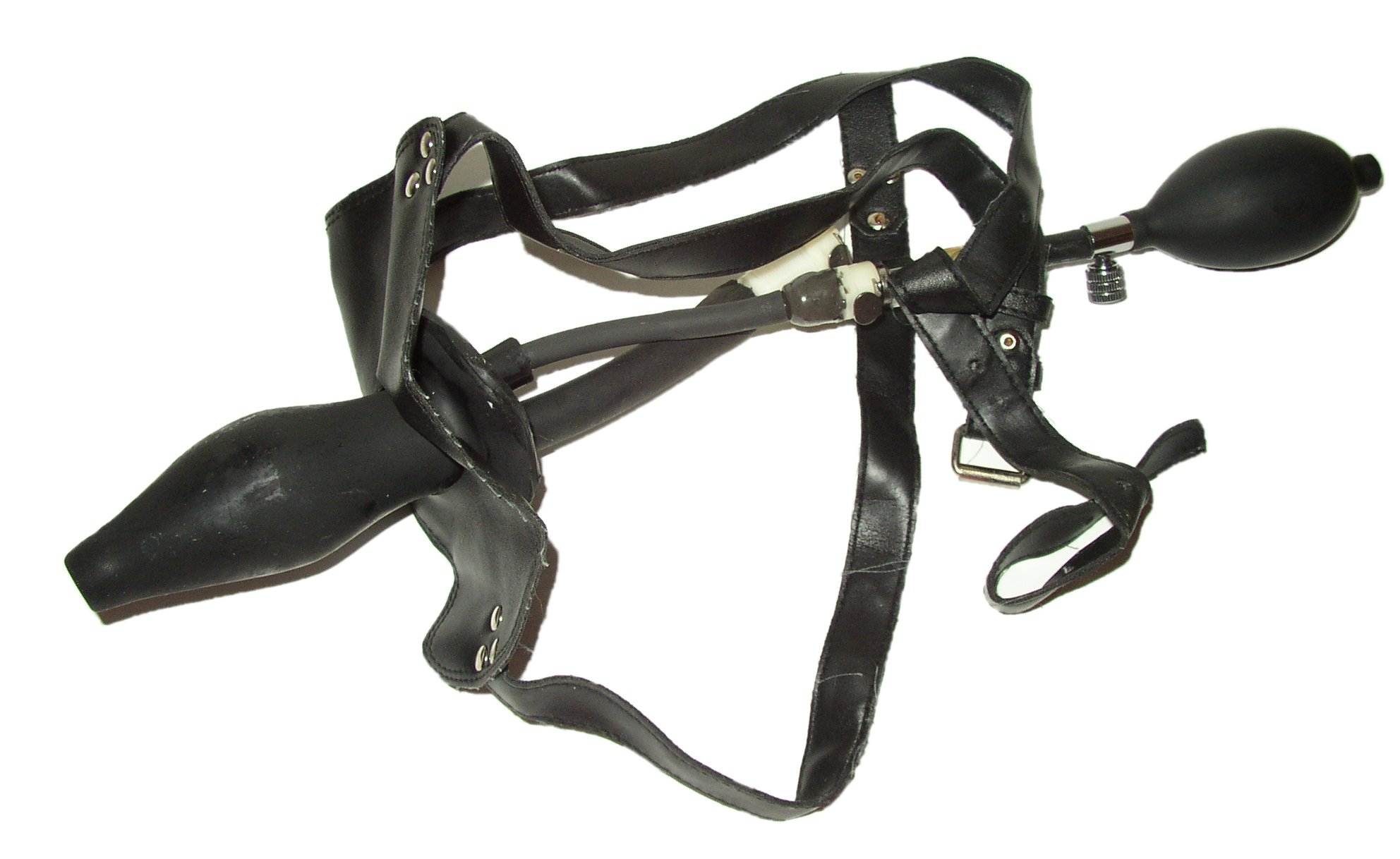
This nozzle (shown here in harness) can be inflated to a diameter wider than a rectum to force holding in an enema that could not otherwise be retained. Used either for pleasure or as part of BDSM activities.

==== Pleasure ====
Enjoyment of enemas is known as klismaphilia, which medically is classified as a paraphilia. A person with klismaphilia is a klismaphile.

Both women and men may enjoy sexual enema play, heterosexually and homosexually, experiencing sexual arousal from enemas which they find gratifying or sensual and which can be an auxiliary to, or even a substitute for, genital sexual activity.

Klismaphiles may perceive pleasure from a large, water-distended belly, or the feeling of internal pressure. An enema fetish may include sexual attraction to the involved equipment, processes, environments, situations, or scenarios. Klismaphiles can gain satisfaction of enemas through fantasies, by actually receiving or giving one, or through the process of eliminating steps to being administered one (e.g., under the pretence of being constipated).

That some women use enemas while masturbating was documented by Alfred Kinsey in Sexual Behavior in the Human Female: "There were still other masturbatory techniques which were regularly or occasionally employed by some 11 percent of the females in the sample... Douches, streams of running water, vibrators, urethral insertions, enemas, other anal insertions, sado-masochistic activity, and still other methods were occasionally employed, but none of them in any appreciable number of cases."

==== Other sexually related uses ====
Besides klismaphilia, the intrinsic enjoyment of enemas, there are other uses of enemas in sexual play.

===== BDSM =====
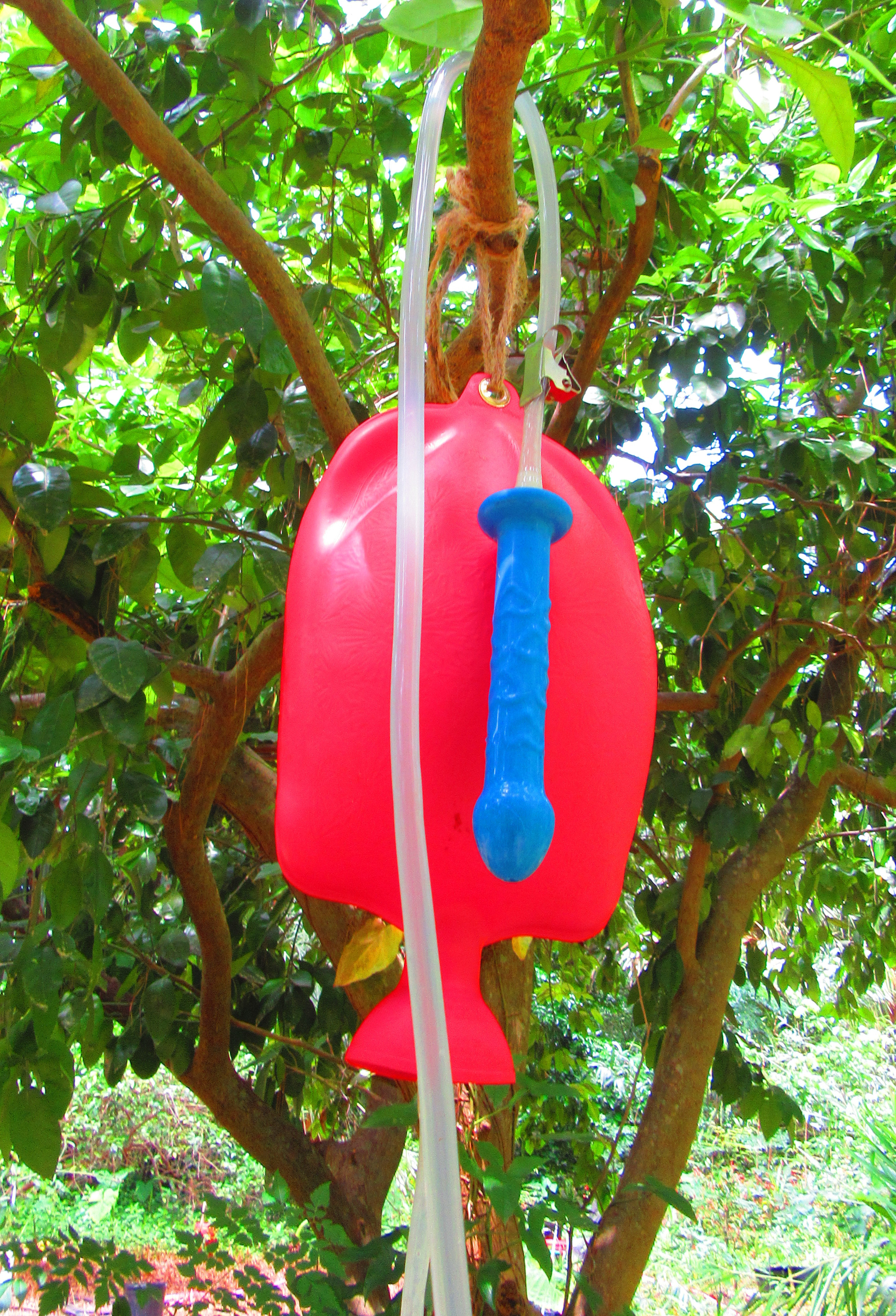
A filled 5 litre enema bag connected to a bored dildo, ready to inject into a recipient on the ground beneath.

Enemas are sometimes used in sadomasochistic activities for erotic humiliation or for physical discomfort.

===== Rectal douching =====
Another sexual use for enemas is to empty the rectum as a prelude to other anal sexual activities such as anal sex, possibly reducing risk of infection.

This is different from klismaphilia, in which the enema is enjoyed for itself and as a part of sexual arousal and gratification.

Rectal douching is a common practice among people who take a receptive role in anal sex although rectal douching before anal sex may increase the risk of transferring HIV, hepatitis B, and other diseases.

==== Intoxication ====
Noting that deaths have been reported from alcohol poisoning via enemas, an alcohol enema can be used to very quickly instill alcohol into the bloodstream, absorbed through the membranes of the colon. However, great care must be taken as to the amount of alcohol used. Only a small amount is needed as the intestine absorbs the alcohol far more quickly than the stomach.

When enema is prescribed for the administration of drugs or alcohol, a cleansing enema may first be used to clean the colon to help increase the rate of absorption.

=== Religious rituals ===
All across Mesoamerica ritual enemas were employed to consume psychoactive substances, e.g., balché, alcohol, tobacco, peyote, and other hallucinogens and entheogens, most notably by the Maya, thus attaining more intense trance states more quickly. Mayan classic-period sculpture and ceramics depict hallucinogenic enemas used in rituals. Some tribes continue the practice today.

With historical roots in the Indian subcontinent, enemas in Ayurveda, called Basti or Vasti, form part of Panchakarma procedure in which herbal medicines are introduced rectally.

=== Punitive usage ===
Enemas have also been forcibly applied as a means of punishment.

Political dissenters in post-independence Argentina were given enemas of chili pepper and turpentine. Turpentine enemas are very harsh purgatives.

In the Guantanamo Bay Detention Camp, the Senate Intelligence Committee report on CIA torture documented instances of enemas being used by the Central Intelligence Agency to ensure "total control" over detainees. Enemas, officials said, are uncomfortable and degrading. The CIA forced nutrient enema on detainees who attempted hunger strikes, documenting "With head lower than torso … sloshing up the large intestines … [what] I infer is that you get a tube up as you can … We used the largest Ewal [sic] tube we had" wrote an officer, and "violent enemas" is how a detainee described what he received.

=== In arts and literature ===
==== Written literature ====
In the Dionysus' satyr play Limos, Silenus attempts to give an enema to Heracles.

In Shakespeare's play Othello (Act II, Scene I) Iago says: "Yet again your fingers to your lips? would they were clyster-pipes for your sake!"

In Cervantes' Don Quixote, a narrative to Sancho includes, "The Knight of the Sun … bound hand and foot … was administered a clyster of snow water and sand that almost disracted him."

In the 17th century, satirists made physicians a favorite target, resembling Molière's caricature whose prescription for anything was "clyster, bleed, purge," or "purge, bleed, clyster".

In Molière's play The Imaginary Invalid, Argan, a severe hypochondriac, is addicted to enemas as indicated by such lines as when Béralde asks, "Can't you be one moment without a purge?"

In George Orwell's novel Nineteen Eighty-Four, the narrator notes, "Sexual intercourse was to be looked on as a slightly disgusting minor operation, like having an enema."

In Grace Metalious's novel Peyton Place, the town doctor tells of "a young boy with the worst case of dehydration I ever saw. It came from getting too many enemas that he didn't need. Sex, with a capital S-E-X." As a teenager, the boy enjoys receiving enemas from his mother.

In Flora Rheta Schreiber's book Sybil, Sybil's psychiatrist asks her, "What's Mama been doing to you, dear? … I know she gave you the enemas."

==== Film ====
In The Right Stuff, during flight training astronaut Alan Shepard retains a barium enema, given two floors away from a toilet, embarrassedly riding a public elevator wearing a hospital gown and holding the enema bag with its tip still inserted in him.

Water Power is a Pornographic film by Gerard Damiano loosely based on the real-life exploits of Michael H. Kenyon, an American criminal who pleaded guilty to a decade-long series of armed robberies of female victims, some of which involved sexual assaults in which he would give them enemas.

==== Song ====
The lyrics of Frank Zappa's song "The Illinois Enema Bandit" are concerned with Michael H. Kenyon's sexual assaults which included administering involuntary enemas.

The album Enema of the State by blink-182 is titled with the word in it. It features a nurse on the cover.

Tool's song "Ænema" from their album titled Ænima is so named because of the lyrics that describe how the singer wants Los Angeles to be "flushed away" in a collapse of the San Andreas Fault, a direct reference to comedian Bill Hicks' "Arizona Bay" routine, thus delivering a much-needed "enema" to the country.

==== Monument ====
A 365-kilogram (805-pound) brass statue of a syringe enema bulb held aloft by three cherubs stands in front of the "Mashuk" spa in the settlement of Zheleznovodsk in Russia. Inspired by the 15th century Renaissance painter Botticelli, it was created by a local artist who commented, "An enema is an unpleasant procedure as many of us may know. But when cherubs do it, it's all right." When unveiled on 19 June 2008, a banner on one of the spa's walls declared "Let's beat constipation and sloppiness with enemas." The spa lying in the Caucasus Mountains region, known for dozens of spas that routinely treat digestive and other complaints with enemas of mineral spring water, the director commented "An enema is almost a symbol of our region." It is the only known monument to the enema.

== See also ==
- Bowel management
- Dry enema
- Fecal microbiota transplant
- Harris flush (sin. carminative enema)
- Murphy drip
- Nutrient enema
- Tobacco smoke enema
- Transanal irrigation
- Rectal douching
