= Angel Gil Hernandez =

Spanish biochemist and molecular biologist

Angel Gil Hernández (born 1951, Granada) is a Spanish professor at the University of Granada (UGR), Spain in the Department of Biochemistry and Molecular Biology. He is also the Honorary President of the Ibero-American Nutrition Foundation (FINUT).

== Early life and education ==
Gil was born in Granada, Spain in 1951. He earned his degree in Biology at the University of Granada, followed by his PhD in Biological Sciences from the same university.

== Research and career ==
The study of the function of dietary nucleotides in early life and the creation of baby nutrition products are just two of professor Gil's many research interests. Additionally, the design, development, and assessment of enteral clinical nutrition products, as well as the isolation, identification, and description of the mechanism of action of probiotics and the metabolic, molecular, and genetic factors involved in obesity and the early onset of the metabolic syndrome (MS) in childhood. Having about 50 years of professional experience, Gil is currently an Emeritus Professor at the University of Granada.

== Awards and honors ==
Gil has been honoured with many awards including the Class Fellow of the American Society of Nutrition (2022).

== Patents ==
Gil has filed many patents for his inventions.

- "Fat mixture for child and adult nutrition," (1994).
- "Nourishing products enriched with nucleosides and/or nucleotides for infants and adults and processes for their preparation," (1996).
- "Protein mixture and use thereof in the preparation of a product that is intended for oral or enteral food," (2008).
- "Food product for enteral or oral nutrition," (2008).
- "Lipid mixture and use thereof in the preparation of a product that is intended for enteral or oral administration," (2009, application since abandoned).
- "Food product for enteral or oral nutrition," (2009, application since abandoned).
- "Mixture of carboyhydrates and its use in the preparation of a product intended for oral or enteral nutrition," (2011, application since abandoned).
- "Functional food supplement intended, in particular, for nutrition and for prevention and improvement in cases of neurological alterations neurodegenerative alterations or cognitive disorders," (2013, application withdrawn).
- "Enteral or oral food product intended, in particular, for nutrition and for the prevention and improvement of neurological alterations, neurodegenerative alterations or cognitive disorders," (2013, application withdrawn).
- "Isolation, identification and characterization of strains with probiotic activity, from faeces of infants fed exclusively with breast milk," (2014).

== Publications ==
- A Stephen, M Alles, C De Graaf, M Fleith, E Hadjilucas, E Isaacs, C Maffeis, G Zeinstra, Christophe Matthys, A Gil. "The role and requirements of digestible dietary carbohydrates in infants and toddlers".
- Ricardo Uauy, Richard Quan, Angel Gil. "Role of nucleotides in intestinal development and repair: implications for infant nutrition".
- N Nieto, MI Torres, MI Fernandez, MD Giron, A Rios, MD Suarez, A Gil. "Experimental ulcerative colitis impairs antioxidant defence system in rat intestine".
- Angel Gil, Rosa M Ortega, José Maldonado. "Wholegrain cereals and bread: a duet of the Mediterranean diet for the prevention of chronic diseases". Public health nutrition.
- Angel Gil, Fernando Gil. "Fish, a Mediterranean source of n-3 PUFA: benefits do not justify limiting consumption".
