= Respiratory route =

The respiratory route may refer to:

- Airborne disease
- A route of administration of drugs, including nasal administration, inhalation and insufflation
- Transmission of pathogens via respiratory droplets
