= SLSA =

SLSA can refer to:

- The Saint Lucia Scout Association, the national Scouting organization of Saint Lucia
- Society for Literature, Science, and the Arts
- Sodium lauryl sulfoacetate, an organic compound used as a surfactant
- Special light-sport aircraft, an American category of factory-built two seat aircraft
- State Library of South Australia
- Surf Life Saving Australia, the peak surf lifesaving organisation in Australia
