= Douchebag =

Douchebag may refer to:

- A device used to administer a douche
  - Rectal douching, the act of administering a douche anally
- A pejorative term for an arrogant or obnoxious person
- Douchebag (film), a 2010 film directed by Drake Doremus
- "Douche Bag", a song by Limp Bizkit from Gold Cobra
