= Basti (Panchakarma) =

Basti is an enema of herbal oils or decoctions used in Ayurveda.

Basti is one of the five Pradhana Karmas of Panchakarma and it is used to treat vata disorders.

== See also ==
- Ayurveda
- Basti (Hatha Yoga)
