= Harris flush =

A Harris flush is a type of enema aimed to evacuate painful flatus from a patient who has undergone abdominal surgery. It differs from a standard enema in that it is intended to alleviate flatus, while the purpose of standard enemas is to principally remove stool.

A Harris Flush kit is required. A sterile tube is inserted into the rectum and sterile water is flushed upward into the colon and then aspirated through the same tube. The excess gas is removed via the aspirated water. The procedure relies on gravity to accomplish its goal with the nurse slowly raising, then lowering, the enema bag while it remains connected to the hose, while nozzle remains in the patient's rectum. The procedure is repeated several times.
