= Enteral administration =

Administration of food in the gastrointestinal tract

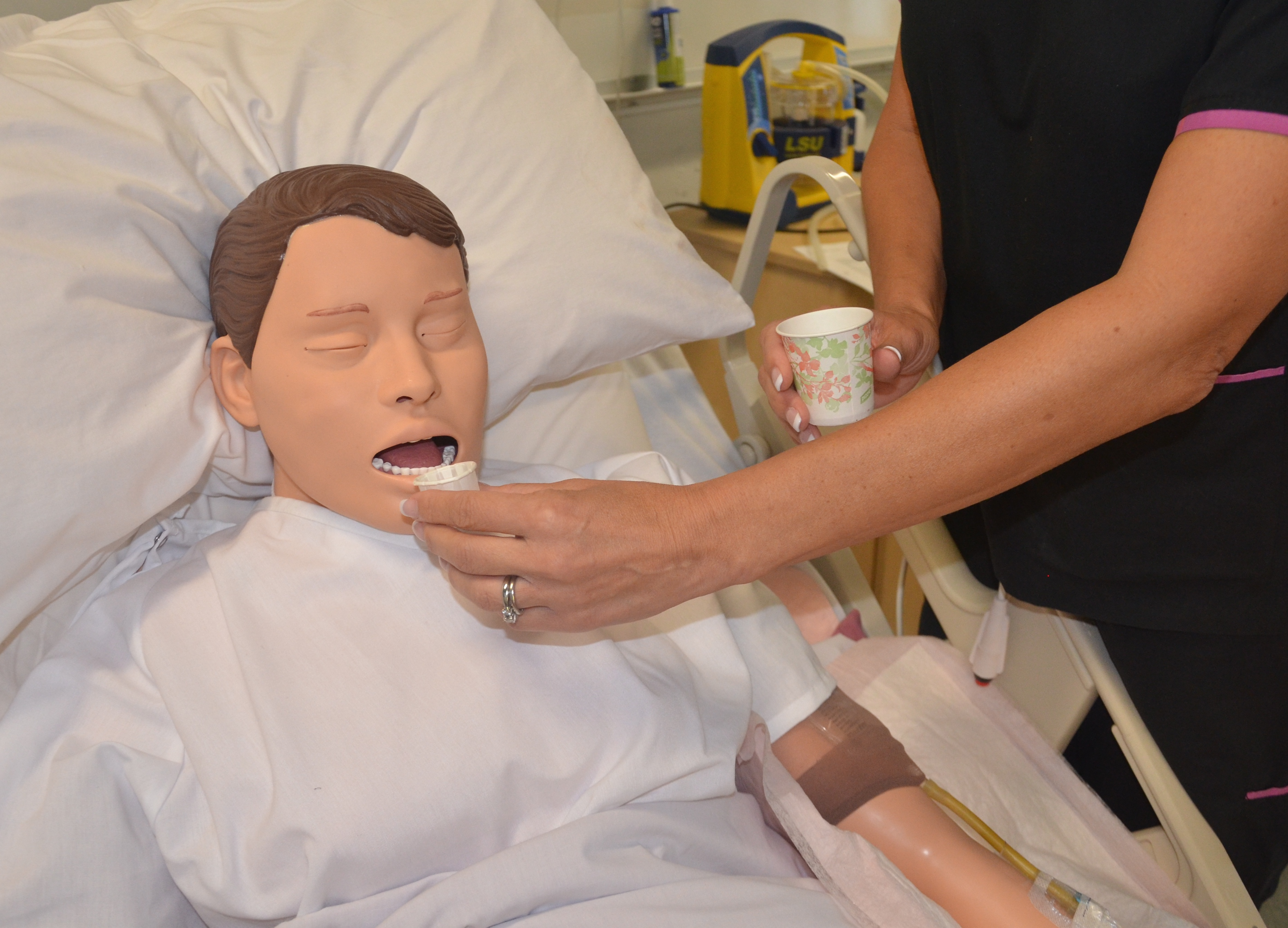
A medical professional demonstrates how to offer oral medication to a dummy.

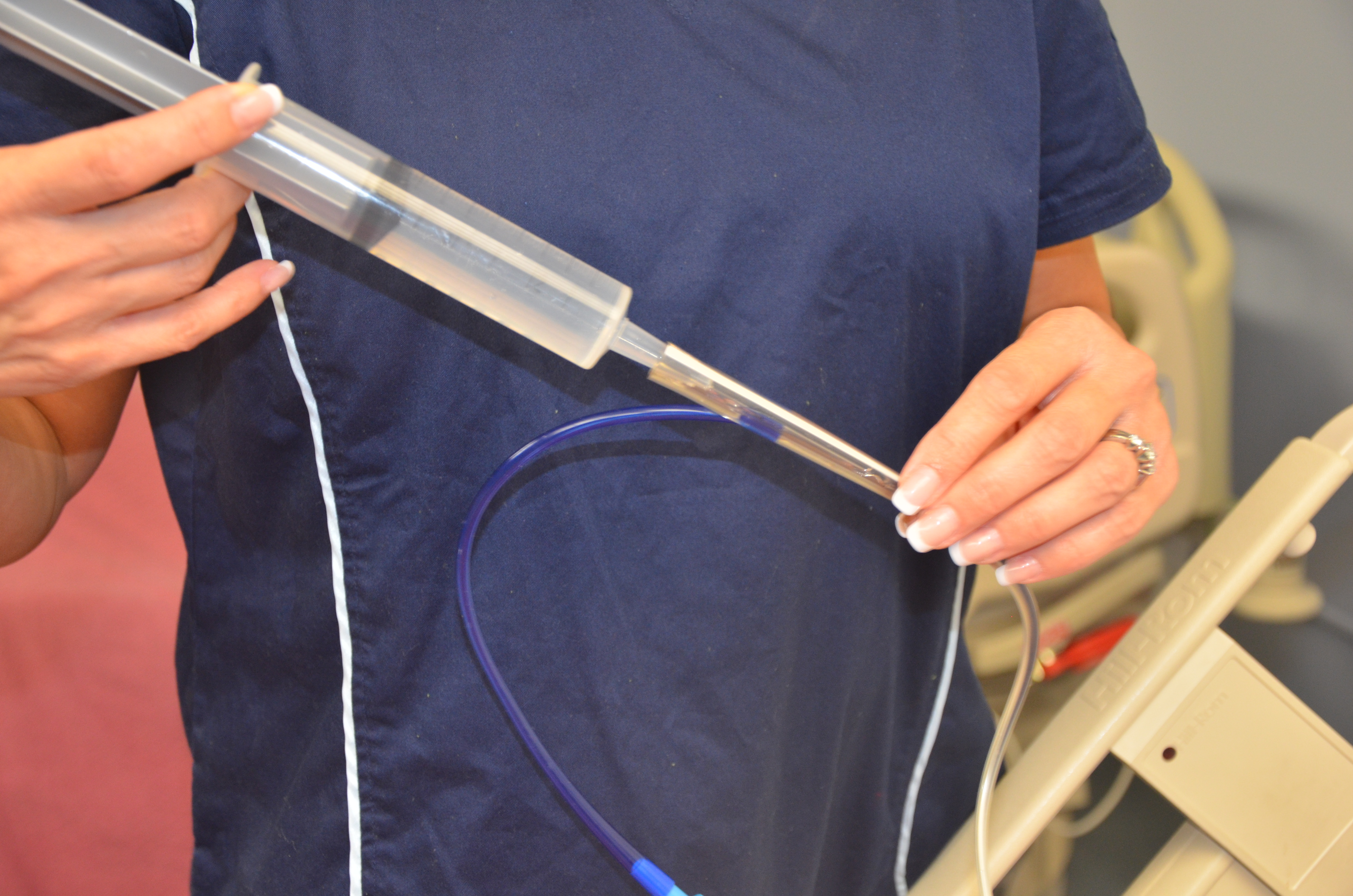
A medical professional injects medication into a gastric tube.

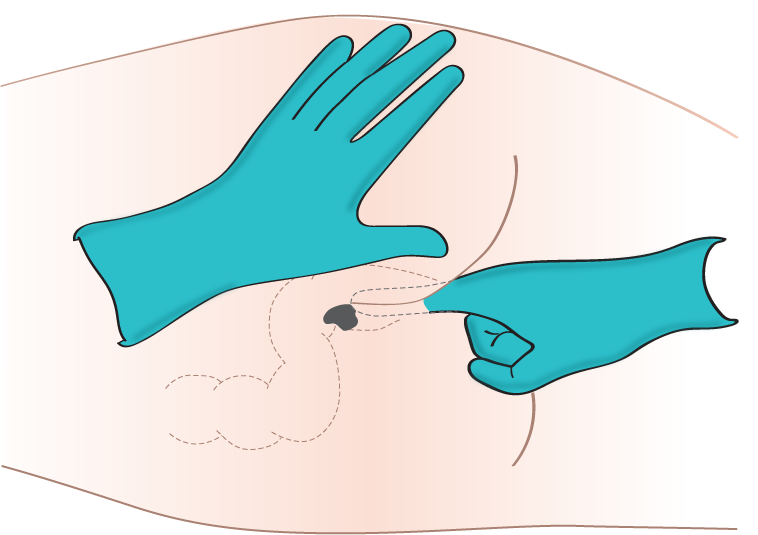
Administering medication rectally

Enteral administration is food or drug administration via the gastrointestinal tract. This contrasts with parenteral nutrition or drug administration (Greek para, "besides" + enteros), which occurs from routes outside the GI tract, such as intravenous routes. Enteral administration involves the esophagus, stomach, and small and large intestines (i.e., the gastrointestinal tract). Methods of administration include oral, sublingual (dissolving the drug under the tongue), and rectal. Parenteral administration is via a peripheral or central vein. In pharmacology, the route of drug administration is important because it affects drug metabolism, drug clearance, and thus dosage. The term is from Greek enteros 'intestine'.

== Forms ==
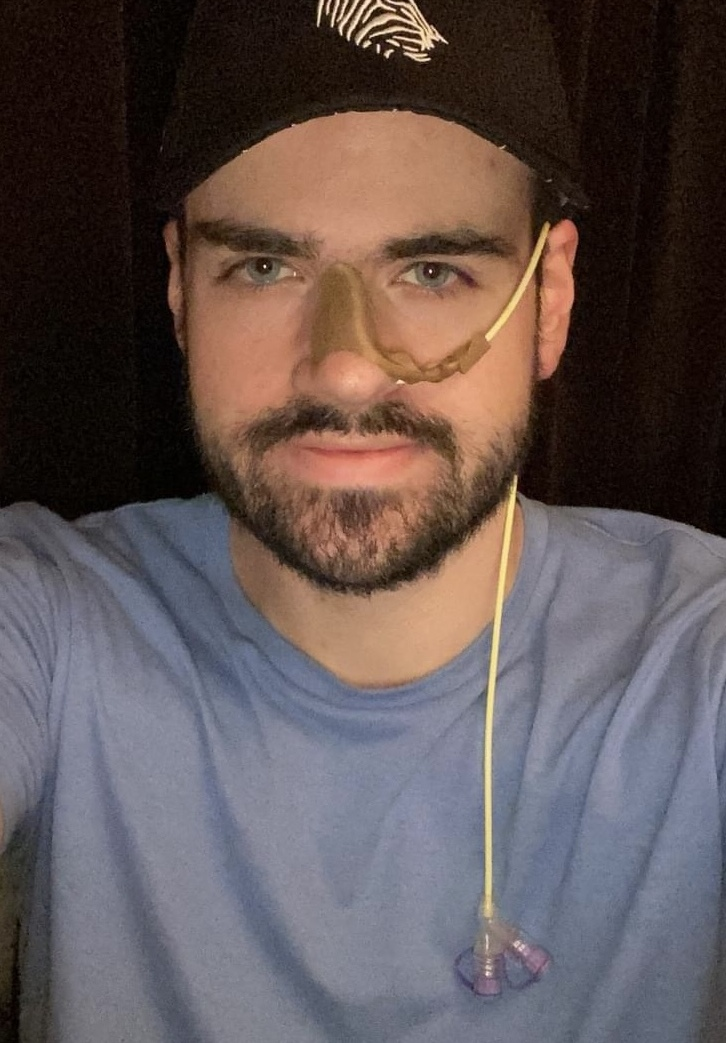
A man with a nasogastric tube allowing food and medicine to be delivered through the nose and straight to the stomach

Enteral administration may be divided into three different categories, depending on the entrance point into the GI tract: oral (by mouth), gastric (through the stomach), and rectal (from the rectum). (Gastric introduction involves the use of a tube through the nasal passage (NG tube) or a tube in the belly leading directly to the stomach (PEG tube). Rectal administration usually involves rectal suppositories.)

Oral administration		Rectal administration
Solids	Liquids	-
Pill	Solution	Ointment
Tablet	Softgel	Suppository
Time release technology	Suspension	Enema
Osmotic controlled release capsule	Emulsion	Murphy drip
	Syrup	Nutrient enema
	Elixir	
	Tincture	
	hydrogel	

== Drug absorption from the intestine ==
The mechanism for drug absorption from the intestine is for most drugs passive transfer, a few exceptions include levodopa and fluorouracil, which are both absorbed through carrier-mediated transport. For passive transfer to occur, the drug has to diffuse through the lipid cell membrane of the epithelial cells lining the inside of the intestines. The rate at which this happens is largely determined by two factors: Ionization and lipid solubility.

Factors influencing gastrointestinal absorption:

- Gastrointestinal motility.
- Splanchnic blood flow.
- Particle size and formulation.
- Physicochemical factors.

== First pass metabolism ==
Drugs given by enteral administration may be subjected to significant first pass metabolism, and therefore, the amount of drug entering the systemic circulation following administration may vary significantly for different individuals and drugs. Rectal administration is not subject to extensive first pass metabolism.

== See also ==
- Enteric (disambiguation)
- Feeding tube
