= Dry enema =

Technique for cleansing the human rectum

A dry enema is an alternative technique for cleansing the human rectum either for reasons of health, or for sexual hygiene. It is accomplished by squirting a small amount of sterile lubricant into the rectum, resulting in a bowel movement more quickly and with less violence than can be achieved by an oral laxative.

It is called "dry" in contrast to the more usual wet enema because no water is used.

== Techniques ==
=== Suppositories ===
A rudimentary form of "dry" enema is the use of a non-medicated glycerin suppository. However, due to the relative hardness of the suppository – necessary for its insertion into the human body – before glycerin can act, it must be melted by the heat of the body, and hence it does not take effect for up to an hour. Often, the hygroscopic glycerin irritates the sensitive membranes of the rectum resulting in forceful expulsion of the suppository without any laxative effects.

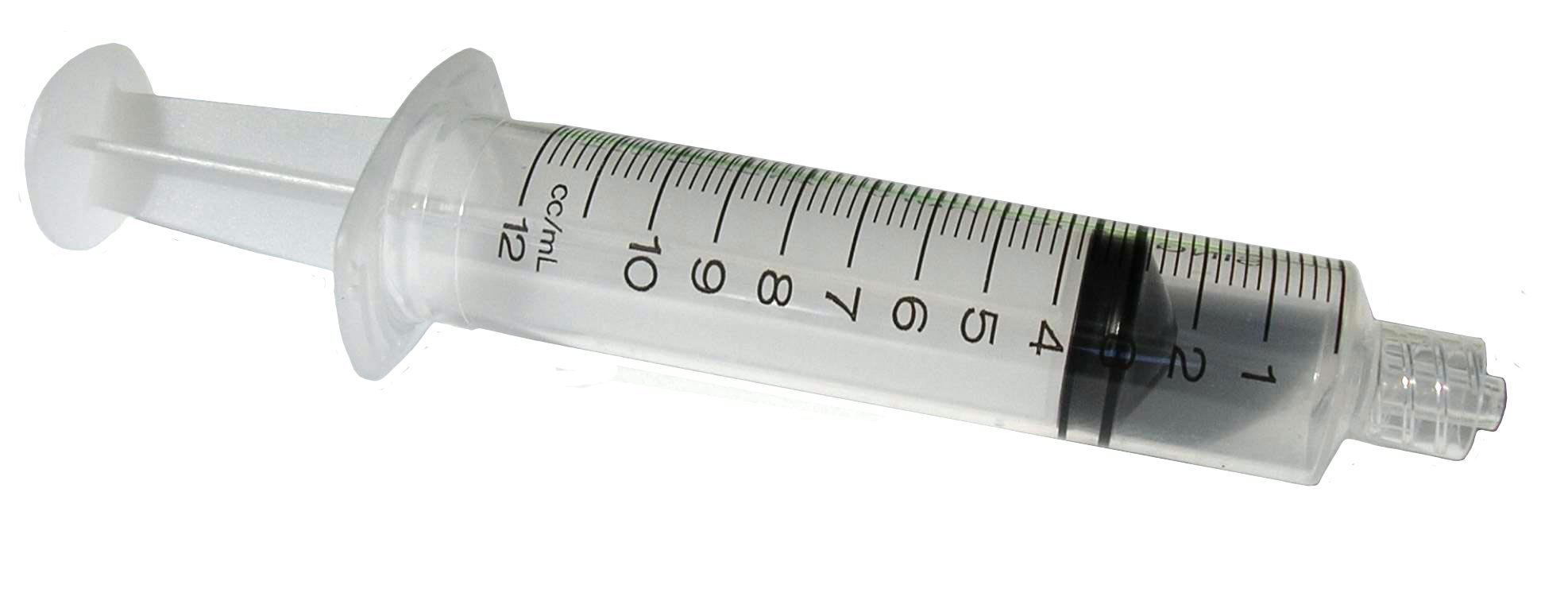
A disposable syringe

=== Lubrication injection ===
A quicker form of the dry enema utilizes the injection of a small amount of water-based lubricant such as KY Jelly into the rectum via a non-hypodermic syringe, such as an oral syringe, or from some other source. Then again since the glycerin itself is an effective producer of the desired contraction of the colonic muscles, it is simpler – and more easily controlled – to introduce 5–10 cc of glycerin directly into the rectum. Specialist syringes are available for this purpose but are hard to find. An alternative is to use an enema nozzle which has an intake end which is compatible with a standard hypodermic syringe. This allows the immediate injection of the 5–10 cc required, and results can be expected in 2–4 minutes. Another alternative is to use a normal 5 or 10 cc syringe inserted directly into the anus. This needs to be done carefully to avoid scratching the anal passage. The passage should be lubricated with sorbolene cream, or any water-based lubricant. Only a syringe with a Luer-slip should be used, not a Luer-lock tip, (a syringe end molded to take a screw-on needle). Penetration is better performed by the patient, to eliminate any pain. The patient should be encouraged to wait at least 15 minutes so that peristalsis can reach the full length of the rectum, but many will find this impossible and this treatment should therefore be applied only when the facilities to evacuate are nearby.

The usual amount of lubricant applied is about 2 tsp (10 cc), which will produce a movement in 30 minutes or less. The movement will be produced in a compact body, rather than in the more copious liquid form produced by a wet enema; and since no water is used, none will be retained higher up in the colon, to be expelled at a later, and possibly inconvenient, time.

A further advantage of this technique for sexual hygiene is that any slight remaining traces of fecal material will – due to the presence of the lubricant – tend to adhere to the wall of the rectum rather than to any foreign object which may subsequently be inserted.
