= Sodium citrate/sodium lauryl sulfoacetate/glycerol =

Pharmaceutical combination

Combination of
- Sodium citrate: Laxative
- Sodium lauryl sulfoacetate: Laxative
- Glycerol: Laxative

Clinical data
- Trade names: Microlax, Micolette Micro enema
- AHFS/Drugs.com: International Drug Names
- ATC code: A06AG11 (WHO)

Identifiers
- ChemSpider: none

Sodium citrate/sodium lauryl sulfoacetate/glycerol sold under the brandname Microlax and Micolette Micro enema, among others, is a small tube of liquid gel that is used to treat constipation.

The main active ingredients are sodium lauryl sulfoacetate (0.90% w/v), sodium citrate (9.0% w/v) and glycerol.

== Medical uses ==
The main use is for treatment of constipation. In surgery it is used for pre-operative evacuation of the bowel. In diagnostic testing it is used before x-ray examinations or physical examinations of the colon.

It is safe for use in children. If used in children under 3 years, it is recommended that the nozzle is only inserted half way. It is safe as a laxative during the postnatal period for woman and while breastfeeding.

== Contraindications ==
Microlax (like any other saline laxative) should not be used in cases of intestinal inflammation.

== Mechanism of action ==
Sodium citrate saline is one of the most effective osmotic laxatives (secondary in action only to magnesium citrate). Its laxative action is the result of osmotic imbalance that extracts bound water from stool and pulls it back into the large bowel. The increased water content softens the stool and stimulates the bowel to contract (move its contents to the rectum).

Sodium lauryl sulfoacetate improves the wetting and penetrating abilities of the solution, sorbitol enhances the water-releasing effect of sodium citrate and glycerol helps to lubricate the stool. The combined action helps to soften hard stools and relieve constipation without straining in a very short period of time ~ 15 min.

The ingredients are not absorbed, distributed or metabolised by the human body; all of the composition is excreted in faeces.

== History ==
1960 - Microlax micro-enema was invented in Sweden by Paul Gunnar Embring from Uppsala and Per Ove Mattsson from Stockholm for Pharmacia company. The original purpose of the invention was for clearing the colon and rectum for X-ray investigation "without any risk of the fluid balance of the body being disturbed".

The first use of "Microlax" in commerce was registered on June 16, 1960. In 1962, Microlax registered as the US trademark on February 20, 1962.

In May 1963 first medical article on Microlax published in Danish medical journal Ugeskrift for Læger (Weekly Journal for Physicians).

In 1964, Microenema containing sodium citrate, sodium laurylsulphoacetate and sorbitol was tested in preparation of the bowel for sigmoidoscopy. Results were published in the American Journal of Proctology. In 1965 a comparative study of Microlax and enema published in Ugeskrift for Læger. In 1967 – an article, published in The Medical Journal of Australia proved the results of 1964 US study and confirmed the efficiency of using Microlax as part of preparation for sigmoidoscopy. In 1996 a study in the Journal of the Royal Society of Medicine suggested mailing "Microlax" micro-enemas to patients who are scheduled for sigmoidoscopy.
