= Doctor Willard Bliss =

19th century American physician who treated Pres. James Garfield in 1881

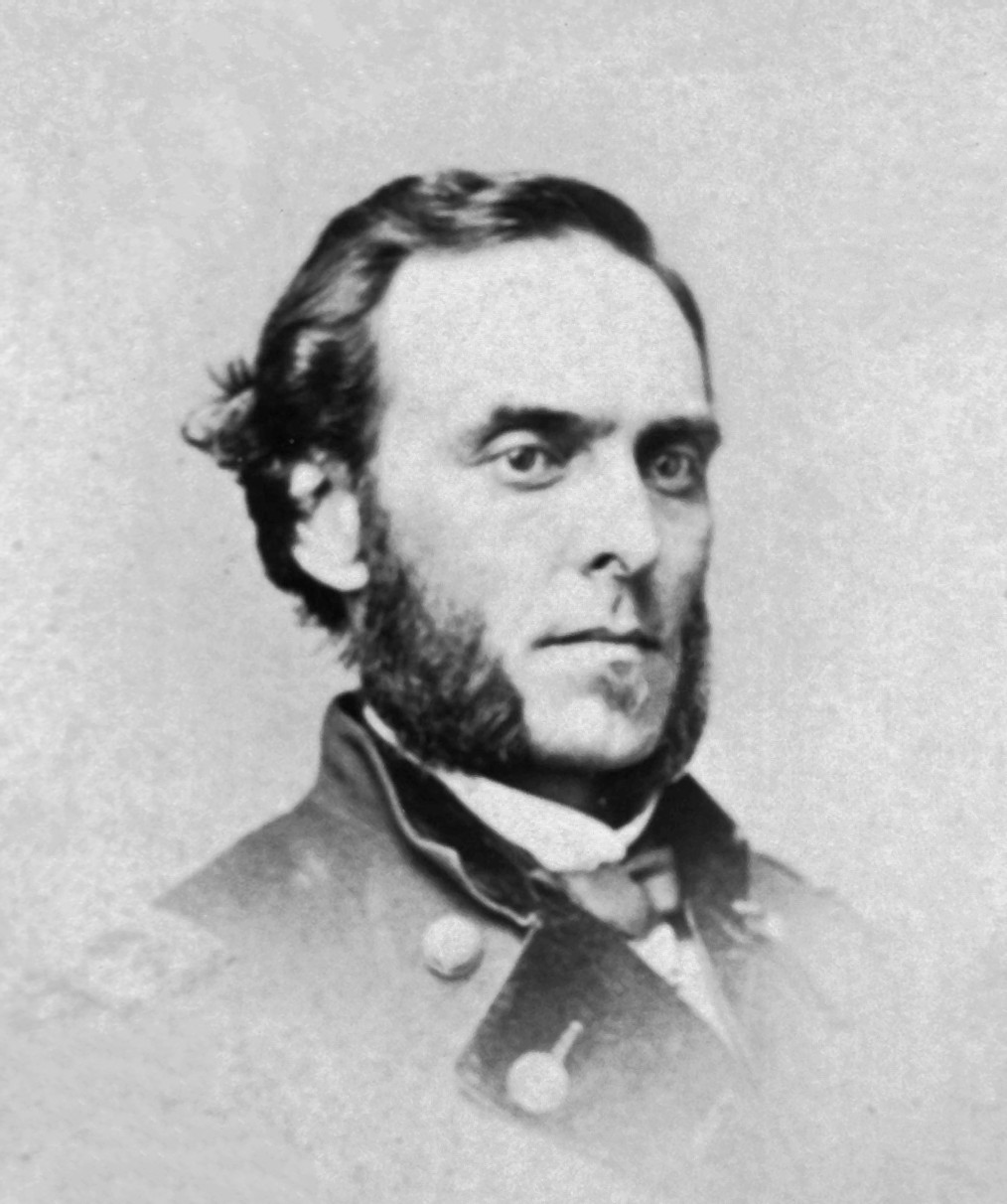
- Born: August 18, 1825; Brutus, New York, United States
- Died: February 21, 1889 (aged 63); Washington, D.C., United States
- Education: Cleveland Medical College
- Known for: Attending physician to President Garfield
- Medical career
- Profession: Physician
- Sub-specialties: Ballistic trauma

Doctor Willard Bliss (Note: Bliss was named for a local medical doctor, and so given the forename "Doctor") (August 18, 1825 – February 21, 1889) was an American medical doctor and pseudo-expert in ballistic trauma, who treated President of the United States James A. Garfield after his shooting in July 1881 until his death two and a half months later.

== Early life and career ==
D.W. Bliss was born in Brutus, New York, to Obediah Bliss (1792–1863) and Marilla Pool (1795–1857). Bliss's first and middle names (Doctor and Willard) were inspired by Samuel Willard, a surgeon from New England. During his youth, the Bliss family lived in Savoy, Massachusetts. Bliss had one brother, Zenas (July 4, 1832 – April 23, 1877).

Bliss treated Zachary Taylor for malaria at Fort Jesup, Louisiana, in 1844.

Bliss studied at Cleveland Medical College, submitting his thesis on Pseudarthrosis or False-Joint in 1849. He advertised and sold cundurango, a product of Ruehssia cundurango, incorrectly claiming it as a "wonderful remedy for cancer, syphilis, scrofula, ulcer...and all other chronic blood diseases", for which he was expelled from the Washington, D.C. Medical Society in 1853.

During the American Civil War, Bliss was a surgeon with the Third Michigan Infantry. Bliss later became superintendent at Washington, D.C.'s Armory Square Hospital; he continued to practice in the city after the war had ended. In April 1863, he accepted a $500 bribe to use a certain inventor's stove in the hospital and was held for several days in the Old Capitol Prison.

Bliss was expelled from the District of Columbia Medical Society for his support of homeopathy and his opposition to the society's exclusion of black members. After having his career threatened for embracing homeopathy, Bliss was hesitant to accept another new movement in medicine, the antiseptic methods proposed by Joseph Lister.

Bliss was mentioned in correspondence by Walt Whitman, who claimed that Bliss answered the House of Representatives' proposal for his pension in 1887 by saying, "I am of opinion that no one person who assisted in the hospitals during the war accomplished so much good to the soldiers and for the Government as Mr. Whitman".

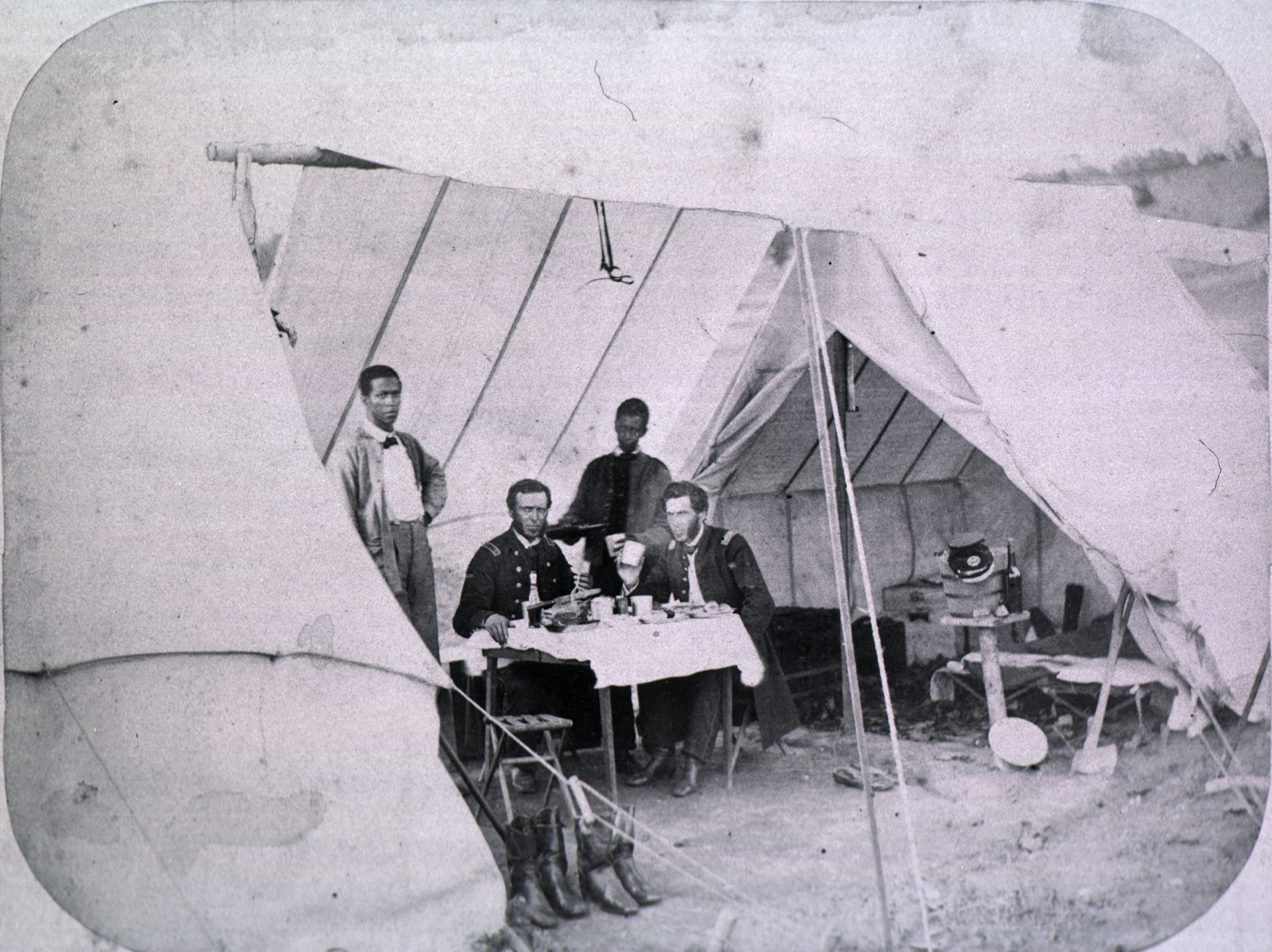
Bliss and his brother Zenas E. Bliss in 1861

== Treatment of James Garfield ==
On July 2, 1881, Bliss was summoned by Robert Todd Lincoln after James A. Garfield had been shot by Charles J. Guiteau at the Baltimore and Potomac Railroad Station in Washington, D.C. Bliss examined Garfield's bullet wounds with his fingers and metal probes, concluding the bullet was in the President's liver.

Bliss immediately commandeered as Garfield's doctor, most likely to restore his own reputation, after their return to the White House. He ordered to have the president isolated, confining him to a room in the White House. Garfield's personal physician Jedediah Hyde Baxter arrived at the White House the next day to see Garfield; after a heated exchange, Bliss ousted Baxter, and wrote a letter to other doctors requesting them not to see Garfield. As trained nurses were uncommon at this time, Bliss used Cabinet members' wives as help, even though they had no knowledge of nurses' duties. Two days following the shooting, Bliss summoned two surgeons, David Hayes Agnew and Frank Hastings Hamilton, to help. Throughout the next weeks, Bliss repeatedly probed Garfield's wound with unsterilized fingers and instruments. As Garfield's condition grew increasingly worse and he became unable to keep down his food, Bliss began rectally feeding him.

Bliss also invited Alexander Graham Bell to test his metal detector on the President, hoping that it would locate the bullet. The device's signal was thought to be distorted by the metal bed springs. Later the detector was proved to work perfectly and would have found the bullet had Bliss allowed Bell to use the device on Garfield's left side as well as his right side.

After Garfield's death, Bliss submitted a claim for $25,000 (equivalent to $830,000 in 2025) for his services to the President. He was offered $6,500 (equivalent to $220,000 in 2025) instead, an offer that he refused.

Some, even at the time, believed that Bliss was guilty of malpractice, a claim unsuccessfully raised by Guiteau's attorneys during the trial.

== Personal life ==
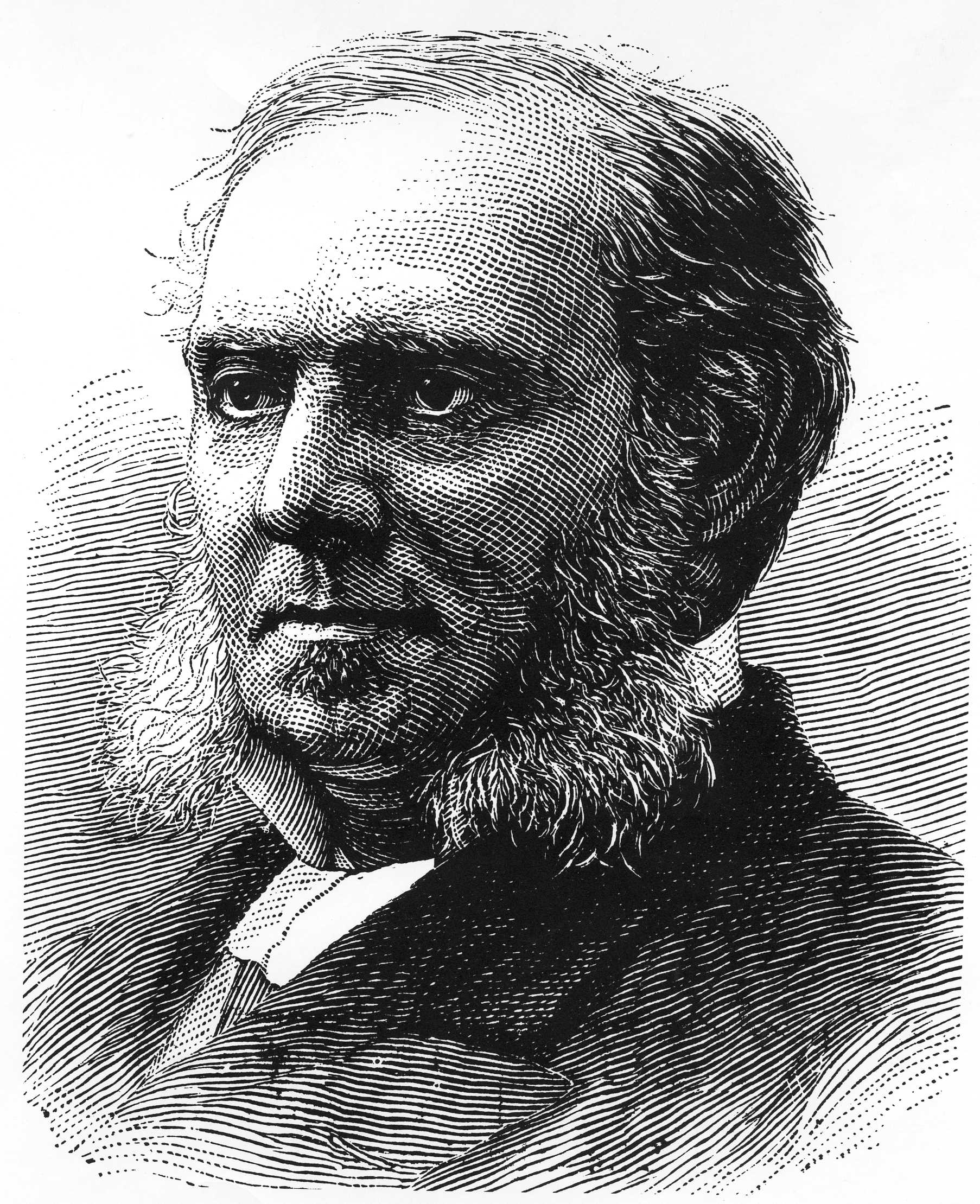
Dr. Bliss in Harper's Weekly in 1881

Bliss married Sophia Prentiss (1825–1888) in Cuyahoga County, Ohio, on May 23, 1849. They had four children: Elliss Baker (born April 25, 1850), a dentist; Clara Bliss Hinds, a medical practitioner; Willie Prentiss (born February 1854, died August 17, 1856 "by an accident") and Eugenie Prentiss (born August 10, 1855). The family lived in a house in Washington, D.C. built by John Quincy Adams.

Sophia died in January 1888 in Washington, D.C.; Bliss died in the same city on February 21, 1889. His death was attributed to heart failure or apoplexy.

== Publications ==
- Bliss, Doctor Willard (1849). A thesis on pseudarthrosis or false-joint. Cleveland, OH: Cleveland Medical College.
- Bliss, D.W. (1882). Feeding Per Rectum: As Illustrated in the Case of the Late President Garfield, and Others.
- Bliss, Doctor Willard (1882). Excerpts from opinions of distinguished medical men in this and other countries justifying the treatment of the late President Garfield. Washington, D.C.: Gibson Brothers.
- Bliss, Doctor Willard (1890). The Morgan horse: an essay on Justin Morgan and his family.
