= Enteric (disambiguation) =

Enteric is a general term describing something related to or associated with the intestines.

Enteric may also refer to:

- Enteric nervous system
- Enteric coating that is often applied to pills and supplements
- "Enteric fever" is a name for typhoid fever
- Enteric duplication cysts
- Enteral administration of food or drugs given orally or rectally
- Methane emitted from livestock is known as Enteric fermentation
