= Nutrient enema =

Form of administering nutrition

A nutrient enema, also known as feeding per rectum, rectal alimentation, or rectal feeding, is an enema administered to provide nutrition in cases where normal eating is not possible. In modern medicine, nutrient enemas have been superseded by tube feeding and parenteral nutrition (intravenous feeding).

== History ==
This treatment is ancient, dating back at least to the second century AD when documented by Galen, and commonly used in the Middle Ages, remaining a common technique in 19th century.

=== 19th century ===
Doctor Willard Bliss prescribed this treatment to United States President James A. Garfield after his attempted assassination by Charles J. Guiteau on July 2, 1881. Garfield died after a failed recovery on September 19, 1881.

=== 20th century ===
In 1941, the U.S.' military manual for hospital diets prescribed use of nutrient enemas.

=== 21st century ===
In 2014, when the United States Senate Intelligence Committee published the Committee Study of the CIA's Detention and Interrogation Program, an unclassified summary of its 6,000 page classified report on the CIA's use of "enhanced interrogation techniques", its previously unknown practices of brutally forced nutrient enemas on detainees who attempted hunger strikes and of "rectal rehydration" for punishment and torture became apparent.

The South Park episode "Red Hot Catholic Love" features a fictionalized, inaccurate depiction of rectal feeding followed by fecal vomiting.

== Physiology ==
A variety of different mixes have been used for nutrient enemas throughout history. A paper published in Nature in 1926 stated that because the rectum and lower digestive tract lack digestive enzymes, it is likely that only the end-products of normal digestion such as sugars, amino acids, salt and alcohol, will be absorbed.

== See also ==
- Murphy drip
