= Rectal douching =

Act of rinsing the rectum with liquid

Rectal douching (rectal irrigation)
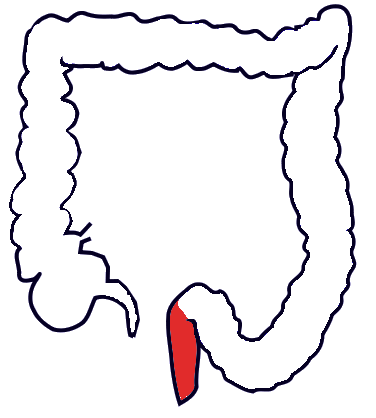
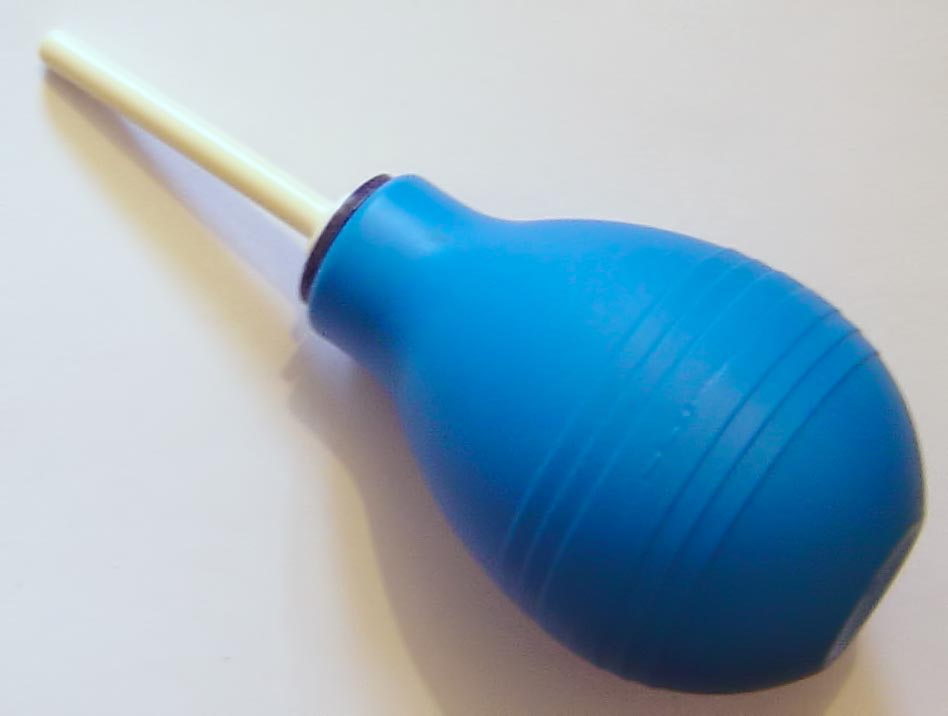
- Illustration of the large intestine highlighting in red the rectum, the portion cleansed by a rectal douche Device to perform a rectal douche: with the tip inserted, the bulb is squeezed to inject liquid.
- Pronunciation: douche, /duːʃ/
- ICD-9-CM: 96.39 "Other transanal enema"
- MeSH: D007507

Rectal douching is the act of rinsing the rectum with intent to clean it. An instance of this rinsing or a tool used to perform the rinse may be called a rectal douche.

== Uses ==
Rectal douching is a hygienic practice to clean the rectum to void hardened stools as opposed to a pharmaceutical method to soften the stool.

Rectal douching is distinguished from anal cleansing, which is the routine cleaning of the anus after defecation.

== Risks ==
Evidence is not clear, but it is possible that rectal douching before anal sex can increase the risk of transferring HIV and other diseases. There is evidence that douching sometimes can disrupt the epithelium, or tissue in the rectum, and if this tissue is damaged, then diseases can spread more easily.

Rectal douching before anal sex increases the risk of transfer of hepatitis B.

There are reports that activities which can have the side effect of causing unintentional forcing of water into the rectum, such as waterskiing, may cause discomfort but can potentially bring other harms.

== Technique ==
Liquid, typically water, is inserted into the rectum by means of some tool. After some time, the water is expelled in the manner of a routine bowel movement, and, in the process, the rectum eliminates waste and is cleaned.

Most people who use rectal douching do so with plain water. The use of a hose connected to a tap, either in a shower or sink, has been reported as the most popular way to administer a douche. Another popular way is with a handheld bulb and syringe designed for rectal douching.

Less commonly, some people used commercial products sold for performing rectal douching, with single-use bottles of saline being most used. Also commercially available but even less commonly used for rectal douching are mineral oil products intended to assist in an enema.

== History ==
A rectal douche device was patented in 1957 in the United States by Patricia Bragg.

== Society and culture ==
From a public health perspective, understanding rectal douching practices may be important because the practice can be paired with behaviors which are risk factors to acquiring a sexually transmitted infection.

== Research ==
Research into rectal microbicide to prevent the transmission of HIV increased interest into researching safer and more gentle rectal douching techniques. The hope in that research is that a rectal microbicide could be delivered with a rectal douche.
