= Insufflation (medicine) =

Act of blowing something (such as a gas, powder, or vapor) into a body cavity

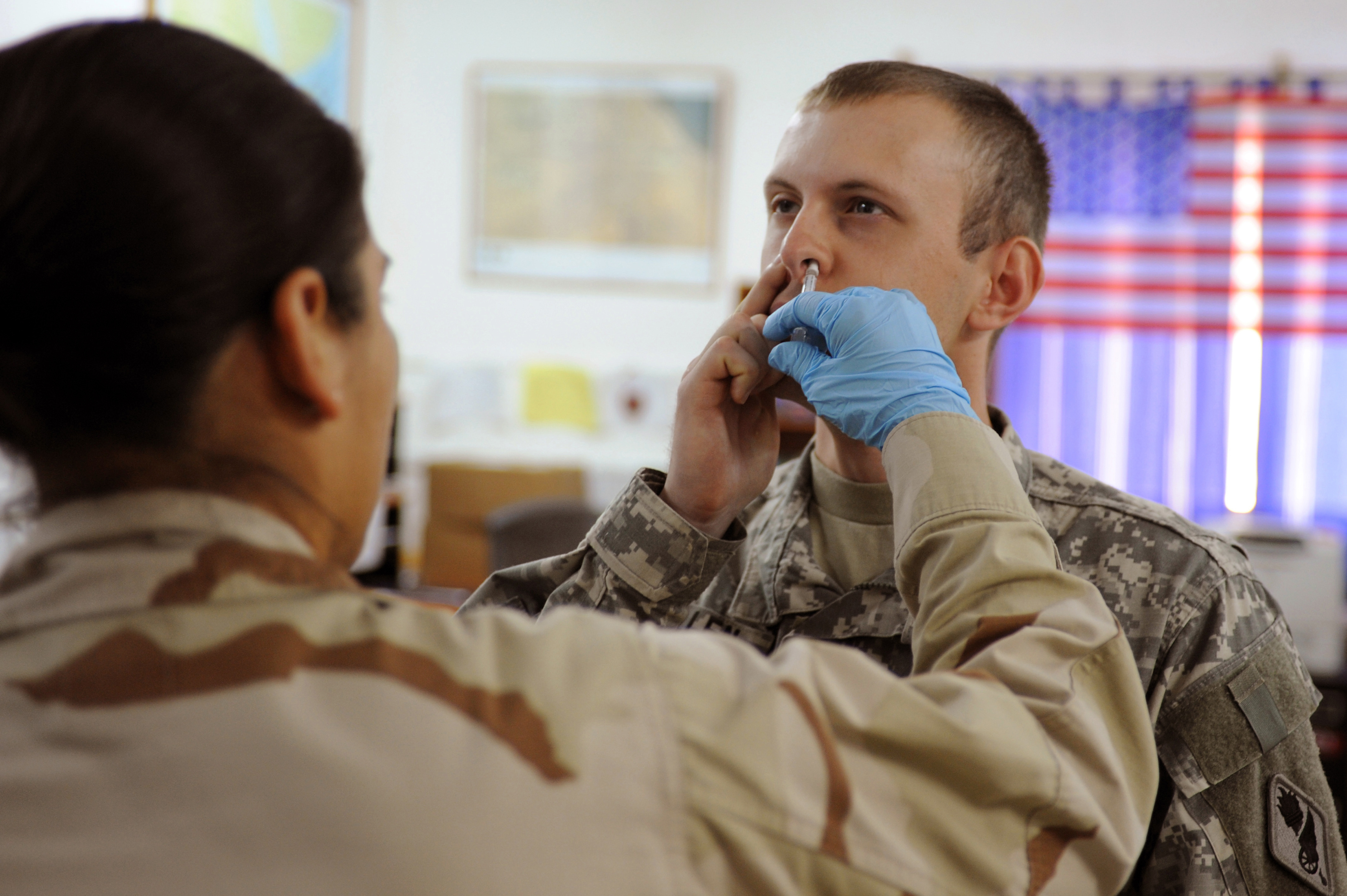
Intranasal flu vaccine

Insufflation (Latin: insufflare, lit. 'to blow into') is the act of blowing something (such as a gas, powder, or vapor) into a body cavity. Insufflation has many medical uses, most notably as a route of administration for various drugs.

== Medical uses ==
=== Surgery ===
Gases are often insufflated into a body cavity to inflate the cavity for more workroom, e.g. during laparoscopic surgery. The most common gas used in this manner is carbon dioxide, because it is inexpensive, non-flammable, colorless, and dissolves readily in blood.

=== Diagnostics ===
Gases can be insufflated into parts of the body to enhance radiological imaging or to gain access to areas for visual inspection (e.g. during colonoscopy).

=== Respiratory assistance ===
Oxygen can be insufflated into the nose by nasal cannulae to assist in respiration.

Mechanical insufflation-exsufflation simulates a cough and assists airway mucus clearance. It is used with patients with neuromuscular disease and muscle weakness due to central nervous system injury.

Glossopharyngeal insufflation is a breathing technique that consists of gulping boluses of air into the lungs. It is also used by breath-hold divers to increase their lung volumes.

Positive airway pressure is a mode of mechanical or artificial ventilation based on insufflation.

Pump inhalers for asthmatics deliver aerosolized drugs into the lungs via the mouth. However, the insufflation by the pump is not adequate for delivery to the lungs, necessitating an active inhalation by the patient.

=== Anesthesia and critical care ===
Insufflated gases and vapors are used to ventilate and oxygenate patients (oxygen, air, helium), and to induce, assist in or maintain general anaesthesia (nitrous oxide, xenon, volatile anesthetic agents).

=== Nasal drug administration ===
Nasal insufflation is the most common method of nasal administration. Other methods are nasal inhalation and nasal instillation. Drugs administered in this way can have a local effect or a systemic effect. The time of onset for systemic drugs delivered via nasal administration is generally only marginally slower than if given intravenously.

==== Examples of drugs given ====
- Steroids (local effect) and anti-asthma medication
- Hormone replacement
- Decongestants (local effect)
- Nicotine replacement
- Migraine medication
- Vaccines

Nasal administration can also be used for treatment of children or patients who are otherwise alarmed or frightened by needles, or where intravenous (IV) access is unavailable.

== History ==
In the 18th century, the tobacco smoke enema, an insufflation of tobacco smoke into the rectum, was a common method of reviving drowning victims.
