= Transanal irrigation =

- Other names: retrograde irrigation, (Note: The term retrograde irrigation distinguishes this procedure from the Malone antegrade continence enema, where irrigation fluid is introduced into the colon proximal to the anus via a surgically created irrigation port) anal irrigation, rectal irrigation, bowel irrigation, transanal colonic irrigation, bowel washouts.
- Specialty: Gastroenterology

Transanal irrigation is medical procedure in which water is used to evacuate feces from the rectum and descending colon via the anus.

Transanal irrigation uses a large volume water enema system. It is carried out every day (or every 2 days) by the patient or carer as a long term management for bowel dysfunction, including fecal incontinence and/or constipation (especially obstructed defecation).

Although the procedure and general goals may be similar, transanal irrigation is different from colon cleansing (colon hydrotherapy), which is a term used in alternative medicine. Transanal irrigation is used for medical conditions which affect defecation, such as spinal cord injury or multiple sclerosis. Colon cleansing is used outside of mainstream medical supervision, and may be used in the belief that the procedure removes toxins from the body.

The impact of transanal irrigation varies considerably. Some individuals experience complete control of incontinence, and other report little or no benefit. Evidence shows this treatment can be considered for children as well. When diet and medication has proven ineffective, transanal irrigation may be used.

== Procedure ==
Transanal irrigation systems may use either a rectal balloon catheter or a cone-shaped colostomy tip.

The catheter tip is inserted into the anal canal. Systems with balloon catheters require inflation of the balloon once the tip is in position. Cone shaped colostomy tip systems must be supported manually.

Lukewarm tapwater (36-38 °C) is used if it is drinkable. If tap water is not safe for drinking, a different source of clean water is needed. The irrigation bag is ideally placed or hung 1-1.5 m above the level of the toilet. The flow is switched on with a handheld valve. The flow rate of the water may be controlled by a manual pump or a battery pump.

The volume of water used is normally about 1000 ml. Some sources recommend repeat irrigation with a higher volume up to 2300 ml.

Transanal irrigation may be performed every day or every other day in order to simulate a normal defecation routine. Ideally, irrigation is performed at the same hour each day.

The optimal volume and frequency may be determined by trial and error for each individual patient during the first few months of treatment.

The time required for the procedure is in the range of 30–120 min.

Some individuals take oral constipating medications or oral laxative medications in addition to transanal irrigation.

It is unclear whether the mechanism of action of irrigation is by simple mechanical washing out of the bowel, or by triggering of colonic mass movements, or both.

Disadvantages of the treatment may include:

- Social stigma causing problems with cohabitation, travel, and work/study or leisure activities.
- Requires training by a healthcare professional so individual understands how to use the equipment
- A degree of dexterity is required to perform transanal irrigation at home. If the individual cannot perform the irrigation themselves, a carer may be required
- Periodic sterilization and replacement of the equipment is needed, or microbial biofilms may start grow inside the tubing, contaminating the irrigation fluid. Current TAI devices offer single-use rectal catheters or cones.
- Requires a lot of time to administer and wait for full evacuation (30–120 min). This evacuation time may be increased in those with obstructed defecation.
- Persistent leaking of residual irrigation fluid after the irrigation may occur and make this option unhelpful as liquids are more difficult to retain than solids in persons with fecal incontinence.

== Indications ==
- Functional constipation
- Obstructed defecation syndrome (functional evacuation disorders)
- Unsuccessful treatment with biofeedback, medicines, surgery.

Specific conditions for which transanal irrigation has been used include:

- Spina bifida.
- Anorectal malformations.
- spinal cord injury.
- Multiple sclerosis.
- After surgery such as low anterior resection, dynamic graciloplasty.

== Contraindications ==
- TAI may be successfully used only if there is normal formation of solid feces in the colon.
- Active inflammatory bowel disease.
- Mass in rectum or colon causing bowel obstruction.
- Surgical anastomosis in the rectum or colon carried out with in the last 6 months.

== Effectiveness ==
A Cochrane review found evidence that transanal irrigation was more effective compared to conservative management in the management of spinal cord injury. There were more positive benefits for constipation scores, neurogenic bowel dysfunction scores, and fecal incontinence scores. Patients spent less time in total on bowel care and were more satisfied with the treatment.

- Avoids surgery, medications, or other procedures
- By regularly emptying the bowel using transanal irrigation, controlled bowel function is often re-established to a high degree in patients with bowel dysfunction. This enables the users to develop a consistent bowel routine by choosing the time and place of evacuation.
- In patients with constipation, regular evacuation of the lower part of colon and rectum can accelerate transit through the entire colon. There has, perhaps unsurprisingly, been a rapid uptake of transanal irrigation methods in highly symptomatic patient groups with anorectal symptoms.
- In individuals with fecal incontinence, efficient emptying of the lower part of colon and rectum means that new feces may not reach the rectum for up to 2 days, which may prevent leakage between irrigations.
- May decrease the incidence of urinary tract infections in patients with neurogenic bowel and bladder problems

== Adverse effects ==
The treatment is generally considered safe. However, adverse effects are reported, including:

- Minor abdominal pain or rectal pain/discomfort, or cramps.
- Chills.
- Nausea.
- Minor rectal bleeding.
- Electrolyte imbalance (not demonstrated when using either tap water or saline solution).
- Leakage of water around the catheter tip during procedure.
- Anal stricture or rectal stricture / fibrosis. One publication stated that "it is well known that the abuse of self- administered enemas may cause anorectal fibrosis and stricture, due to repeated microtrauma."

=== Bowel perforation ===
Bowel perforation is when the wall of the bowel ruptures. It is a potentially lethal complication which requires emergency surgery. 49 bowel perforations caused by transanal irrigation were reported between 2005 and 2013. This rate was used to calculate a risk of 2-6 perforations per 1 million procedures. This risk of perforation is significantly lower compared to other common medical procedures such as flexible sigmoidoscopy (1 perforation per 40000 procedures), colonoscopy (1 per 1000) and barium enema (1 per 10000). However, patients may need to conduct transanal irrigation daily or near-daily for many years, which increases their lifetime risk. Perforation is more likely in the first weeks after starting treatment. People who have had a surgical anastomosis (for example, after low anterior resection, stapled transanal rectal resection, ventral mesh rectopexy, or other types of surgery for rectal prolapse) are more at risk of bowel perforation during transanal irrigation.

=== Long term effects on anorectal physiological function ===
One study reported before and after changes in anorectal physiology tests in patients with idiopathic faecal incontinence or chronic idiopathic constipation. The patients had all used transanal irrigation for at least 30 months. In the chronic idiopathic constipation group there was no reduction in anal sphincter function after long term use of transanal irrigation. In the idiopathic faecal incontinence group anal resting and squeeze pressures were lower after long term use of transanal irrigation. The researchers suggested that this was due to age related changes in sphincter function and the deterioration of the disease over time rather than due to the use of transanal irrigation. In both groups rectal urge volume increased after long term use of transanal irrigation. The researchers suggested that patients get accustomed to larger rectal volumes, and without the irrigation their everyday sensation of urge from the presence of stool in the rectum is decreased. This may encourage patients to continue using the irrigation. However, rectal compliance (how well the rectum can stretch and accommodate increasing volumes without triggering discomfort or pain) and biomechanical properties of the rectal wall were unchanged.
