= Sodium lauryl sulfoacetate =

Names
- IUPAC name sodium;2-dodecoxy-2-oxoethanesulfonate
- Other names Lathanol

Identifiers
CAS Number	1847-58-1
3D model (JSmol)	Interactive image
ChemSpider	15024
DrugBank	DB13157
ECHA InfoCard	100.015.847
EC Number	217-431-7
PubChem CID	23668827
UNII	D0Y70F2B9J
CompTox Dashboard (EPA)	DTXSID4027442
- InChI: InChI=1S/C14H28O5S.Na/c1-2-3-4-5-6-7-8-9-10-11-12-19-14(15)13-20(16,17)18;/h2-13H2,1H3,(H,16,17,18);/q;+1/p-1 Key: UAJTZZNRJCKXJN-UHFFFAOYSA-M
- SMILES: CCCCCCCCCCCCOC(=O)CS(=O)(=O)[O-].[Na+]
- Except where otherwise noted, data are given for materials in their standard state (at 25 °C [77 °F], 100 kPa). Infobox references

Sodium lauryl sulfoacetate (SLSA) or lathanol is an organic compound used in many cleaning and hygiene products as an anionic surfactant. Also it is used as in sodium citrate/sodium lauryl sulfoacetate/glycerol laxative products.
