= C12H22O11 =

The chemical formula C_{12}H_{22}O_{11} (molar mass: 342.29 g/mol, exact mass : 342.116212) may refer to:

- Disaccharides
  - Allolactose
  - Cellobiose
  - Galactose-alpha-1,3-galactose
  - Gentiobiose (amygdalose)
  - Isomaltose
  - Isomaltulose
  - Kojibiose
  - Lactose (milk sugar)
  - Lactulose
  - Laminaribiose
  - Maltose (malt sugar - cereal)
  - 2α-Mannobiose
  - 3α-Mannobiose
  - Melibiose
  - Melibiulose
  - Nigerose
  - Sophorose
  - Sucrose (table sugar)
  - Trehalose
  - Trehalulose
  - Turanose
