= C12H24O11 =

The molecular formula C_{12}H_{24}O_{11} (molar mass : 344.31 g/mol) may refer to:

- Isomalt
- Lactitol
- Maltitol
