= Xylan 1,4-β-xylosidase =

Enzyme that breaks down xylan and xylobiose

Identifiers
- EC no.: 3.2.1.37
- CAS no.: 9025-53-0

Databases
- IntEnz: IntEnz view
- BRENDA: BRENDA entry
- ExPASy: NiceZyme view
- KEGG: KEGG entry
- MetaCyc: metabolic pathway
- PRIAM: profile
- PDB structures: RCSB PDB PDBe PDBsum
Search
- PMC: articles
- PubMed: articles
- NCBI: proteins

Xylan 1,4-β-xylosidase (EC 3.2.1.37, xylobiase, β-xylosidase, exo-1,4-β-xylosidase, β-D-xylopyranosidase, exo-1,4-xylosidase, exo-1,4-β-D-xylosidase, 1,4-β-D-xylan xylohydrolase) is an enzyme with systematic name 4-β-D-xylan xylohydrolase. This enzyme catalyses the following chemical reaction

Hydrolysis of (1->4)-β-D-xylans, to remove successive Dxylose residues from the non-reducing termini

This enzyme also hydrolyses xylobiose.
