= Happy Tooth =

Happy Tooth logo.

The Happy Tooth is a registered trademark of Toothfriendly International. It stands for guaranteed toothfriendly quality.

The Happy Tooth mark distinguishes products that are not harmful for teeth. In order for products to carry the logo they have to be scientifically tested and proven not to be cariogenic or erosive. The test is based on the measurement of the pH of dental plaque and saliva and is carried out by three appointed independent university institutes.

The compliance of a product is tested by means of intra-oral pH telemetry. Applying a standardized method, the plaque pH is measured at least in four volunteers during and for 30 minutes after consumption of the product with an indwelling, interproximally placed, plaque-covered electrode. Products which do not lower plaque pH below 5.7 under the conditions of this test, lack a cariogenic potential. The erosive potential is measured with a plaque free electrode. The acid exposure of the teeth must not exceed 40 mmol H min. Schachtele Ch.F. et al. (1986). Human plaque acidity models – Working Group Consensus Report. J. Dent. Res., 65 (Spec. Iss.): 1530–1531.

Toothfriendly International grants the rights to use the trademark.
