= Alfred Wöhlk =

Alfred Wöhlk, also: Woehlk, Wøhlk, (1868–1949) was a Danish chemist and pharmacist. With his historical detection reaction from 1904, the lactose content of dairy products can be visualized. This is useful because many people are lactose intolerant and avoid dairy products. Countless pharmacy students, but also physicians, laboratory assistants, and recently also chemistry teachers know the Wöhlk test.

Since its discovery in 1904 until the 1960s, the Wöhlk test has mainly been used to detect the reducing disaccharide lactose in urine in medical laboratories. Although there were already a number of wet-chemical detection methods to identify sugars, such as the Fehling or Benedict test, those analyses could only differentiate between reducing and non-reducing sugars. Since both glucose and lactose molecules have an aldehyde group in the open-chain form, the result was positive in both cases. Only the Woehlk test allowed a safe differentiation between glucose and lactose.

Thus, a relatively harmless milk congestion (lactosuria) could be differentiated from a dangerous gestational diabetes. With lactose, the tested urine develops a significant red color, with glucose, only a yellow dye develops, and with sucrose, the color does not change. Until recently there were no or only insufficient ideas about the constitution of the Woehlk and Fearon dyes and their formation. Based on the reactions known in the chemistry of carbohydrates, a structure was created which is consistent with previous experimental observations and has the corresponding features of a chromophore. It was assumed that in the Woehlk and Fearon test for lactose and maltose, the reaction of ammonia and methylamine occurs via the formyl group in C1 and the hydroxyl group in C5 forming a partially saturated heterocyclic pyridine ring.
