= Sophorolipid =

A sophorolipid is a surface-active glycolipid compound that can be synthesized by a selected number of non-pathogenic yeast species. They are potential bio-surfactants due to their biodegradability and low eco-toxicity.

== Structure and properties ==
Sophorolipids are glycolipids consisting of a hydrophobic fatty acid tail of 16 or 18 carbon atoms and a hydrophilic carbohydrate head sophorose, a glucose-derived Disaccharide with an unusual β-1,2 bond and can be acetylated on the 6′- and/or 6′′- positions. One terminal or sub terminal hydroxylated fatty acid is β-glycosidically linked to the sophorose module. The carboxylic end of this fatty acid is either free (acidic or open form) or internally esterified at the 4′′ or in some rare cases at the 6′- or 6′′-position (lactonic form). The physicochemical and biological properties of sophorolipids are significantly influenced by the distribution of the lactone vs. acidic forms produced in the fermentative broth. In general, lactone sophorolipids are more efficient in reducing surface tension and are better antimicrobial agents, whereas acidic sophorolipids display better foaming properties. Acetyl groups can also lower the hydrophilicity of sophorolipids and enhance their antiviral and cytokine stimulating effects.

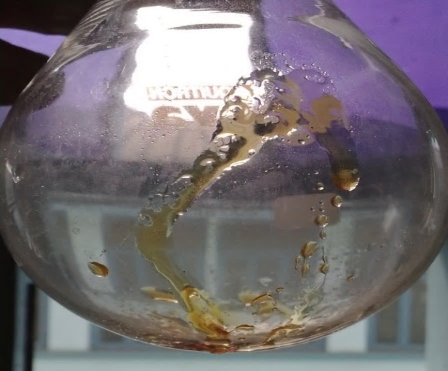
Honey-like viscous, oily, acidic sophorolipids produced by solid state fermentation (SSF) of starmerella bombicola.

Sophorolipids are produced by various non pathogenic yeast species such as Candida apicola, Rhodotorula bogoriensis, Wickerhamiella domercqiae, and Starmerella bombicola and related species. Recent research has meant sophorolipids can be recovered during fermentation using a gravity separator in a loop with the bioreactor, enabling the production of >770 g/L sophorolipid at a productivity 4.24 g/L/h, some of the highest values seen in a fermentation process Desirable properties of biosurfactants are biodegradability and low toxicity.

Besides biodegradability, low toxicity, and high production potential, sophorolipids have a high surface and interfacial activity. Sophorolipids are reported to lower surface tension (ST) of water from 72 to 30-35 mN/m and the interfacial tension (IT) water/hexadecane from 40 to 1 mN/m. In addition to this, sophorolipids are reported to function under wide ranges of temperatures, pressures and ionic strengths; and they also possess a number of other useful biological activities including Antimicrobial, virucidal, Anticancer, Immuno-modulatory properties.

== Research ==
A detailed and comprehensive literature review on the various aspects of sophorolipids production (e.g. producing micro-organisms, bio-synthetic pathway, effect of medium components and other fermentation conditions and downstream process of sophorolipids is available in the published work of Van Bogaert et al. This work also discusses potential application of sophorolipids (and their derivatives) as well as the potential for genetic engineering strains to enhance sophorolipid yields. Researchers have focused on optimization of sophorolipid production in submerged fermentation, but some efforts have also investigated the possibility of sophorololipid production using solid state fermentation (SSF). The production process can be significantly impacted by the specific properties of the carbon and oil substrates used; and several inexpensive alternatives to more traditional substrates have been investigated. These potential substrates include: biodiesel by-product streams, waste frying oil, restaurant waste oil, industrial fatty acid residues, mango seed fat, and soybean dark oil. The use of most of these substrates have resulted in lower yields compared to traditional fermentation substrates.

== Chemical modifications of sophorolipids, and polysophorolipids ==
To enhance the performance of surfactant properties of natural sophorolipids, chemical modification methods have been actively pursued. Recently, researchers demonstrated the possibility of applying sophorolipids as building blocks via ring-opening metathesis polymerization for a new type of polymers, known as polysophorolipids which show promising potentials in biomaterials applications.
