= Tooth-friendly =

Label for non-cariogenic and non-erosive foods

The tooth-friendly label distinguishes products which are non-cariogenic and non-erosive, i.e. safe for teeth. To replace sugar, toothfriendly products often contain sweeteners (polyols, intense sweeteners) that are not fermented by the microflora of the dental plaque. Products that are certified as toothfriendly also do not contain excessive amounts of food acids.

== History ==
In 1983, a WHO working group recommended that the consumption of non-cariogenic "toothfriendly" confectionery should be encouraged.

To provide consumers with easy guidance to toothfriendly products, the Swiss University dental schools decided in the early 1980s to launch a new public information campaign on nutrition and oral health. Instead of advising against the consumption of sweets, the new campaign took a different approach. The basic idea was that consumers should be educated and encouraged to eat only confectionery products that would not harm their teeth. Toothfriendly ("Happy Tooth") label was created. This registered trademark distinguishes products (confectionery, beverage, sweeteners, medicine) that have been proven in a scientific test to lack both significant cariogenic and erosive potential.

The "toothfriendliness" of a product is tested by means of intraoral pH telemetry. Applying a standardized method, the plaque pH is measured at least in four volunteers during and for 30 minutes after consumption of the product with an indwelling, interproximally-placed, plaque-covered electrode. Products that do not lower plaque pH below 5.7, under the conditions of this test, lack a cariogenic potential. The erosive potential is measured with a plaque-free electrode. The acid exposure of the teeth must not exceed 40 micromol H min.

The scientific basis for the use of the "Toothfriendly" label has been evaluated and accepted by the Swiss Federal Office of Health, the US-FDA, EFSA, the German Food Control and the competent Australian authorities.

Some examples of toothfriendly sweeteners are: sorbitol, maltitol, isomalt, xylitol, sucralose, stevia, isomaltulose, tagatose, mogroside, and erythritol.

Toothfriendly International certifies products that have been tested and proven to be safe for teeth. It is a non-profit association established in 1989 in Basel, Switzerland. Since then, the association has been granting the rights for the Toothfriendly label to distinguish products that are not harmful for teeth. The members of the organization are dentists, dental and public health institutions, confectionery and oral care manufacturers.

The Toothfriendly Foundation is the charitable arm of the association. The Foundation is responsible for caries prevention projects in less-developed countries.
