= 2,6-β-Fructan 6-levanbiohydrolase =

Class of enzymes

Identifiers
- EC no.: 3.2.1.64
- CAS no.: 37288-46-3

Databases
- IntEnz: IntEnz view
- BRENDA: BRENDA entry
- ExPASy: NiceZyme view
- KEGG: KEGG entry
- MetaCyc: metabolic pathway
- PRIAM: profile
- PDB structures: RCSB PDB PDBe PDBsum
Search
- PMC: articles
- PubMed: articles
- NCBI: proteins

2,6-β-Fructan 6-levanbiohydrolase (EC 3.2.1.64, β-2,6-fructan-6-levanbiohydrolase, 2,6-β-D-fructan 6-levanbiohydrolase, levanbiose-producing levanase, 2,6-β-D-fructan 6-β-D-fructofuranosylfructohydrolase) is an enzyme with systematic name (2→6)-β-D-fructofuranan 6-(β-D-fructosyl)-D-fructose-hydrolase. This enzyme catalyses the following chemical reaction

Hydrolysis of (2→6)-β-D-fructofuranan, to remove successive disaccharide residues as levanbiose, i.e. 6-(β-D-fructofuranosyl)-D-fructose, from the end of the chain
