= Glucan 1,3-β-glucosidase =

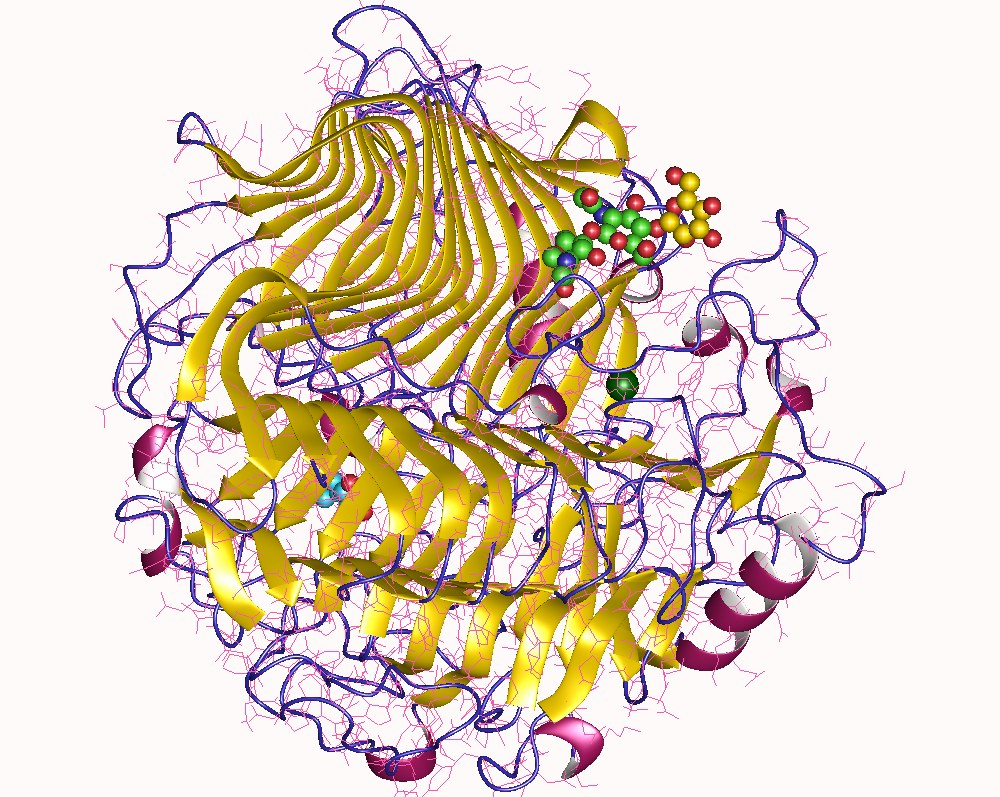
- Glucan 1,3-β-glucosidase monomer, Phanerochaete chrysosporium

Identifiers
- EC no.: 3.2.1.58
- CAS no.: 9073-49-8

Databases
- IntEnz: IntEnz view
- BRENDA: BRENDA entry
- ExPASy: NiceZyme view
- KEGG: KEGG entry
- MetaCyc: metabolic pathway
- PRIAM: profile
- PDB structures: RCSB PDB PDBe PDBsum
Search
- PMC: articles
- PubMed: articles
- NCBI: proteins

Glucan 1,3-β-glucosidase (EC 3.2.1.58, exo-1,3-β-glucosidase, β-1,3-glucan exo-hydrolase, exo (1→3)-glucanohydrolase, 1,3-β-glucan glucohydrolase) is an enzyme with systematic name 3-β-D-glucan glucohydrolase. It catalyses the successive hydrolysis of β-D-glucose units from the non-reducing ends of (1→3)-β-D-glucans, releasing α-glucose.

It acts on oligosaccharides, but very slowly on laminaribiose.
