= Isomalt =

- Haworth/Fischer projections of 1,6-GPS (left) and 1,1-GPM (right)

Identifiers
CAS Number	Isomalt: 64519-82-0; 1,6-GPS: 534-73-6; 1,1-GPM: 20942-99-8
3D model (JSmol)	Isomalt: Interactive image
ChEBI	Isomalt: CHEBI:150326
ChEMBL	Isomalt: ChEMBL2104398
ChemSpider	Isomalt: 9789297; 1,6-GPS: 84985; 1,1-GPM: 80068
ECHA InfoCard	100.122.870
E number	E953 (glazing agents, ...)
PubChem CID	Isomalt: 3034828; 1,6-GPS: 94169; 1,1-GPM: 88735
UNII	Isomalt: S870P55O2W
CompTox Dashboard (EPA)	Isomalt: DTXSID8020753
- InChI: InChI=1S/C12H24O11/c13-1-4(15)7(17)8(18)5(16)3-22-12-11(21)10(20)9(19)6(2-14)23-12/h4-21H,1-3H2/t4?,5-,6-,7-,8-,9-,10+,11-,12+/m1/s1 Key: SERLAGPUMNYUCK-BLEZHGCXSA-N; Isomalt: InChI=1/C12H24O11/c13-1-4(15)7(17)8(18)5(16)3-22-12-11(21)10(20)9(19)6(2-14)23-12/h4-21H,1-3H2/t4-,5-,6-,7-,8-,9-,10+,11-,12+/m1/s1 Key: SERLAGPUMNYUCK-DCUALPFSBK; 1,6-GPS: Key: SERLAGPUMNYUCK-YJOKQAJESA-N; 1,1-GPM: Key: SERLAGPUMNYUCK-DCUALPFSSA-N; Key: SERLAGPUMNYUCK-UHFFFAOYSA-N
- SMILES: Isomalt: O(C[C@@H](O)[C@@H](O)[C@H](O)[C@@H](O)CO)[C@H]1O[C@@H]([C@@H](O)[C@H](O)[C@H]1O)CO.OC[C@@H](O)[C@@H](O)[C@H](O)[C@H](O)CO[C@H]1O[C@H](CO)[C@@H](O)[C@H](O)[C@H]1O

Properties
Chemical formula	C_{12}H_{24}O_{11}
Molar mass	344.313 g·mol^{−1}

Hazards
NFPA 704 (fire diamond)	1 1 0
- Except where otherwise noted, data are given for materials in their standard state (at 25 °C [77 °F], 100 kPa). Infobox references

Isomalt is a sugar substitute, a mixture of the two disaccharide alcohols 1,6-GPS and 1,1-GPM. It is used primarily for its sugar-like physical properties. It has little to no impact on blood sugar levels, and does not stimulate the release of insulin. It also does not promote tooth decay and is considered to be tooth-friendly. Its energy value is 2 kcal per gram, half that of sugars. It is less sweet than sugar, but can be blended with high-intensity sweeteners such as sucralose to create a mixture with the same sweetness as sucrose (‘sugar’).

Like most sugar alcohols (including the chemically similar maltitol), isomalt carries a risk of intestinal distress when consumed in large quantities (above about 20–30 g (1 oz) per day). Isomalt may prove upsetting to the intestinal tract because it is incompletely absorbed in the small intestine, and when polyols pass into the large intestine, they can cause osmotically induced diarrhea and stimulate the gut flora, causing flatulence. As with dietary fibers, regular consumption of isomalt can lead to desensitization, decreasing the risk of intestinal upset.

Isomalt has been approved for use in the United States since 1990. It is also permitted for use in Australia, New Zealand, Canada, Mexico, Iran, the European Union, and other countries.

== Composition and structure ==
Isomalt is an equimolar mixture of two diastereomeric disaccharides: 1-O-α-D-glucopyranosido-D-mannitol (1,1-GPM) and 6-O-α-D-glucopyranosido-D-sorbitol (1,6-GPS). Each of these is composed of two sugars: glucose and mannitol in the case of 1,1-GPM and glucose and sorbitol (also known as glucitol) in the case of 1,6-GPS. Complete hydrolysis of isomalt yields glucose (50%), sorbitol (25%), and mannitol (25%).

Isomalt is an odorless, white, crystalline substance containing about 5% water of crystallisation. Isomalt has a minimal cooling effect (positive heat of solution), lower than many other sugar alcohols, in particular, xylitol and erythritol.

== Manufacture ==
Isomalt is manufactured in a two-stage process in which sucrose (typically derived from beet sugar) is first transformed into isomaltulose using the bacterial enzyme isomaltulose synthase. The isomaltulose is then hydrogenated using a Raney nickel catalyst, producing 1,1-GPM and 1,6-GPS. The product consists of a mixture of anhydrous and dihydrated 1,1-GPM and anhydrous 1,6-GPS.

About 100,000 tons were produced in 2012.

== Uses ==
Isomalt is widely used for the production of sugar-free candy, especially hard-boiled candy, because it resists crystallization much better than the standard combinations of sucrose and corn syrup. It is used in sugar sculpture for the same reason.

Isomalt can also be used as a plasticizer for high methoxyl pectin films. It reduces the rigidity of the edible film by increasing free volume within the structure of the film. Additionally isomalt also reduces the water vapour permeability of the film, thus increasing the quality of the film as it reduces respiration rate, moisture migration, and loss of volatile compounds.

In 2023 it was reported that isomalt, when mixed with cellulose or sawdust, can be used as a moldable, recyclable and biodegradable material that is stronger than PVC and PET. It dissolves upon contact with water but can be protected from water with a layer of shellac and cellulose acetate.
