= Nigerose phosphorylase =

Class of enzymes

Identifiers
- EC no.: 2.4.1.279

Databases
- IntEnz: IntEnz view
- BRENDA: BRENDA entry
- ExPASy: NiceZyme view
- KEGG: KEGG entry
- MetaCyc: metabolic pathway
- PRIAM: profile
- PDB structures: RCSB PDB PDBe PDBsum
Search
- PMC: articles
- PubMed: articles
- NCBI: proteins

Nigerose phosphorylase (EC 2.4.1.279, cphy1874 (gene)) is an enzyme with systematic name 3-O-alpha-D-glucopyranosyl-D-glucopyranose:phosphate beta-D-glucosyltransferase. It catalyses the following chemical reaction:

nigerose
P_{i}
D-glucose
+
β-D-glucose 1-phosphate

The enzyme characterised from Clostridium phytofermentans is a type of glycoside hydrolase and is specific for nigerose (3-O-α-D-glucopyranosyl-D-glucopyranose), which it converts to D-glucose and β-D-glucose 1-phosphate, by adding the phosphate group (P_{i}) to one of the glucose units.
