= Mycodextranase =

Identifiers
- EC no.: 3.2.1.61
- CAS no.: 2610484

Databases
- IntEnz: IntEnz view
- BRENDA: BRENDA entry
- ExPASy: NiceZyme view
- KEGG: KEGG entry
- MetaCyc: metabolic pathway
- PRIAM: profile
- PDB structures: RCSB PDB PDBe PDBsum
Search
- PMC: articles
- PubMed: articles
- NCBI: proteins

Mycodextranase (EC 3.2.1.61, 1,3-1,4-α-D-glucan 4-glucanohydrolase) is an enzyme with systematic name (1→3)-(1→4)-α-D-glucan 4-glucanohydrolase. It catalyses endohydrolysis of (1→4)-α-D-glucosidic linkages in α-D-glucans containing both (1→3)- and (1→4)-bonds

Products are nigerose and 4-α-D-nigerosylglucose.
