= Mannan 1,4-mannobiosidase =

Identifiers
- EC no.: 3.2.1.100
- CAS no.: 81811-49-6

Databases
- IntEnz: IntEnz view
- BRENDA: BRENDA entry
- ExPASy: NiceZyme view
- KEGG: KEGG entry
- MetaCyc: metabolic pathway
- PRIAM: profile
- PDB structures: RCSB PDB PDBe PDBsum
Search
- PMC: articles
- PubMed: articles
- NCBI: proteins

Mannan 1,4-mannobiosidase (EC 3.2.1.100, 1,4-β-D-mannan mannobiohydrolase, exo-β-mannanase, exo-1,4-β-mannobiohydrolase) is an enzyme with systematic name 4-β-D-mannan mannobiohydrolase. It catalyses the hydrolysis of (1→4)-β-D-mannosidic linkages in (1→4)-β-D-mannans, to remove successive mannobiose residues from the non-reducing chain ends.
