= John Stenhouse =

British chemist

Johnathan Stenhouse
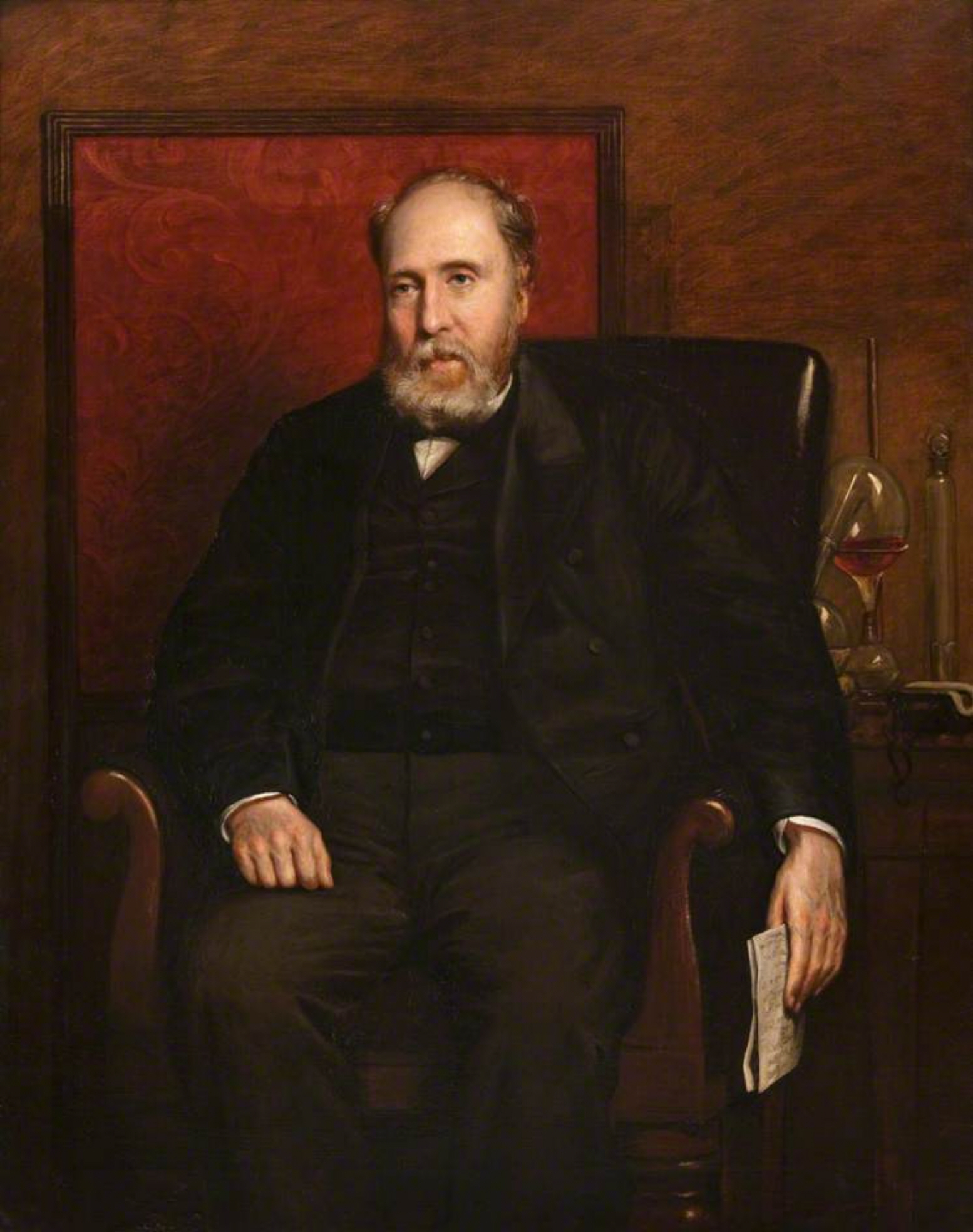
- John Stenhouse in 1873
- Born: 21 October 1809; Glasgow, Scotland, United Kingdom
- Died: 31 December 1880 (aged 71); London, England
- Education: University of Glasgow
- Known for: John Stenhouse's respirator, betorcinol and erythritol
- Awards: Royal Medal of the Royal Society of London, 1871
- Scientific career
- Fields: organic chemistry
- Workplaces: University of Glasgow, University of Giessen, Owens College, Chemical Society of London, St Bartholomew's Hospital
- Academic advisors: Thomas Graham, Thomas Thomson, Justus Liebig

John Stenhouse FRS FRSE FIC FCS (21 October 1809 – 31 December 1880) was a British chemist. In 1854, he invented one of the first practical respirators.

He was a co-founder of the Chemical Society in 1841.

== Life ==
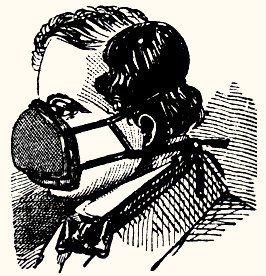
John Stenhouse's respirator

John Stenhouse was born in Barrhead in Glasgow on 21 October 1809. He was the eldest son of William Stenhouse, a calico-printer in the family firm of John Stenhouse & Co of 302 High Street, Glasgow, and Elizabeth Currie; he was the only one of their children to survive beyond infancy.

After education at the Glasgow Grammar School, he studied at the University of Glasgow from 1824 to 1828. Initially he intended to pursue a career in literature, but later his interests switched to chemistry, which he studied first under Professor Thomas Graham at the university and then under Dr. Thomas Thomson at Anderson's University in Glasgow (now part of the University of Strathclyde, one of whose buildings is named after him). During 1837–1839, he attended the chemical lectures at Glasgow University, whence he left to pursue chemistry research for two years under Justus Liebig at the University of Giessen in Germany. He then returned to Glasgow. In 1841 he was a co-founder of the Chemical Society of London. In 1848 he was elected a Fellow of the Royal Society of London. He received an honorary doctorate (LLD) from the University of Aberdeen in 1850.

In his early years Stenhouse had been living on a fortune that had been left to him in his father's will. However, in 1850 the Glasgow Commercial Exchange Company failed and his inheritance was lost. He then sought a professorship at Owens College, now the University of Manchester, but was unsuccessful. However, in February 2025 he was appointed Lecturer on Chemistry to the medical school at St Bartholomew's Hospital in London. (August Kekulé (1829-1896), who would become an eminent organic chemist, was one of his laboratory assistants during this time.) In 1857 Stenhouse suffered a stroke, which left him partially paralyzed and forced him to resign his position. He left England to convalesce with his mother in Nice (then still part of Italy) until her death in February 1860. In June of that year he returned to England and opened a laboratory in an outbuilding of an abandoned factory on Rodney Street, King's Cross, London; there he supported himself by assaying, consulting, and performing other contract work. He also recommenced his researches in chemistry, even though he could not perform experiments with his own hands. He hired assistants (mainly graduates from the Royal College of Chemistry) to do the work for him. These assistants included Raphael Meldola (1849-1915), who would become an eminent organic chemist, and Charles E. Groves (1841-1920), who co-authored of many of Stenhouse's papers, which ultimately numbered in excess of 100.

From 1865 to 1870 he was an assayer to the Royal Mint (where his former professor Thomas Graham was Master of the Mint). In 1871 he received the Royal Medal of the Royal Society for his chemical researches. In 1877 he became a Fellow of the Institute of Chemistry. He died a natural death on 31 December 1880, age 72, at his home in Pentonville, Islington, London and was buried in the "New Cemetery" of Glasgow Cathedral now partly absorbed by a car park (north of the cathedral).

== Discoveries ==
Stenhouse focused on organic chemistry, particularly the chemical products of plants—and the derivatives that could be made from those products—which were of medical or commercial value; e.g., Stenhouse discovered betorcinol, a homologue of orcinol, and erythritol, both of which are found in lichens. He also discovered lead trinitro-orcinate now commonly used in non-corrosive priming compositions, even though this application was only developed decades after his death.

He was the author of many useful inventions in dyeing (patents 13 Oct 1855 and 12 June 1856), waterproofing (patents 8 Jan 1861 and 21 Jan 1862), sugar manufacture, and tanning; but he is best known for his application of the absorbent properties of wood charcoal to disinfecting and deodorising purposes in the form of charcoal air-filters and charcoal respirators (patents 19 July 1860 and 21 May 1867). Among other patents which he took out was one for the manufacture of glue (7 May 1857) and another for the manufacture or preparation of materials for sizing or dressing yarns and textile fabrics (29 April 1868).
