= Kojibiose =

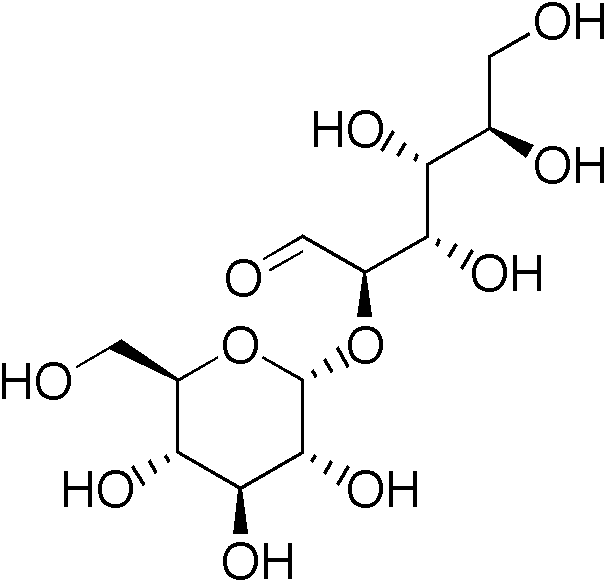

Names
- IUPAC name 2-O-α-D-Glucopyranosyl-D-glucose
- Systematic IUPAC name (2R,3S,4R,5R)-3,4,5,6-tetrahydroxy-2-[(2R,3R,4S,5S,6R)-3,4,5-trihydroxy-6-(hydroxymethyl)oxan-2-yl]oxyhexanal
- Other names 2-alpha-D-glucosyl-D-glucose

Identifiers
CAS Number	2140-29-6
3D model (JSmol)	Interactive image
ChEBI	CHEBI:33020
ChemSpider	144601
MeSH	Kojibiose
PubChem CID	164939
UNII	9R6V2933TB
CompTox Dashboard (EPA)	DTXSID10943954
- InChI: InChI=1S/C12H22O11/c13-1-4(16)7(17)8(18)5(2-14)22-12-11(21)10(20)9(19)6(3-15)23-12/h2,4-13,15-21H,1,3H2/t4-,5+,6-,7-,8-,9-,10+,11-,12+/m1/s1 Key: PZDOWFGHCNHPQD-OQPGPFOOSA-N
- SMILES: O=C[C@H](O[C@H]1O[C@@H]([C@@H](O)[C@H](O)[C@H]1O)CO)[C@@H](O)[C@H](O)[C@H](O)CO

Properties
Chemical formula	C_{12}H_{22}O_{11}
Molar mass	342.30 g/mol
Density	1.688 g/mL
- Except where otherwise noted, data are given for materials in their standard state (at 25 °C [77 °F], 100 kPa). Infobox references

Kojibiose is a disaccharide. It is a product of the caramelization of glucose. It is also present in honey (approx. 3%).

Kojibiose has a mild sweet taste, but low calorie count. In combination with its prebiotic properties, kojibiose could function as a sugar substitute. However, kojibiose is hard to synthesize on an industrial scale. Two enzyme approaches for transforming sucrose and lactose or sucrose and glucose into kojibiose have been developed, potentially solving this problem.
