= Melibiulose =

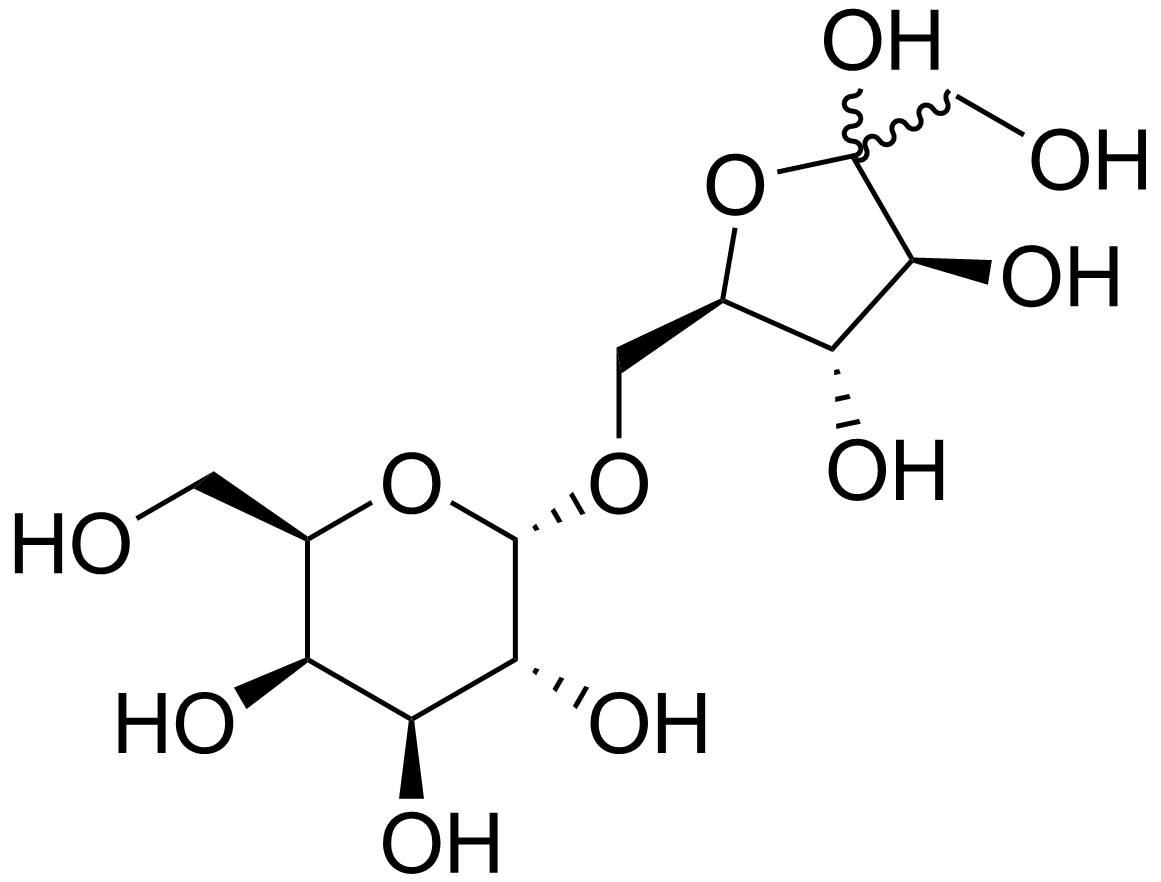

Names
- IUPAC name 6-O-α-D-Galactopyranosyl-D-fructofuranose
- Other names 6-O-α-D-galactopyranosyl-D-fructose

Identifiers
CAS Number	111188-56-8
3D model (JSmol)	Interactive image
ChemSpider	9777340
PubChem CID	11602584
UNII	WX4HQU76X8
CompTox Dashboard (EPA)	DTXSID101028294
- InChI: InChI=1S/C12H22O11/c13-1-4-6(15)8(17)9(18)11(22-4)21-2-5-7(16)10(19)12(20,3-14)23-5/h4-11,13-20H,1-3H2/t4-,5-,6+,7-,8+,9-,10+,11+,12?/m1/s1 Key: PVXPPJIGRGXGCY-XIOYNQKVSA-N; InChI=1/C12H22O11/c13-1-4-6(15)8(17)9(18)11(22-4)21-2-5-7(16)10(19)12(20,3-14)23-5/h4-11,13-20H,1-3H2/t4-,5-,6+,7-,8+,9-,10+,11+,12?/m1/s1 Key: PVXPPJIGRGXGCY-XIOYNQKVBL
- SMILES: O[C@H]1[C@H](O)[C@H](OC1(O)CO)CO[C@H]2O[C@H](CO)[C@H](O)[C@H](O)[C@H]2O

Properties
Chemical formula	C_{12}H_{22}O_{11}
Molar mass	342.297
- Except where otherwise noted, data are given for materials in their standard state (at 25 °C [77 °F], 100 kPa). verify (what is ?) Infobox references

Melibiulose is a disaccharide formed from fructose and galactose similar to melibiose.
