= Laminaribiose phosphorylase =

Class of enzymes

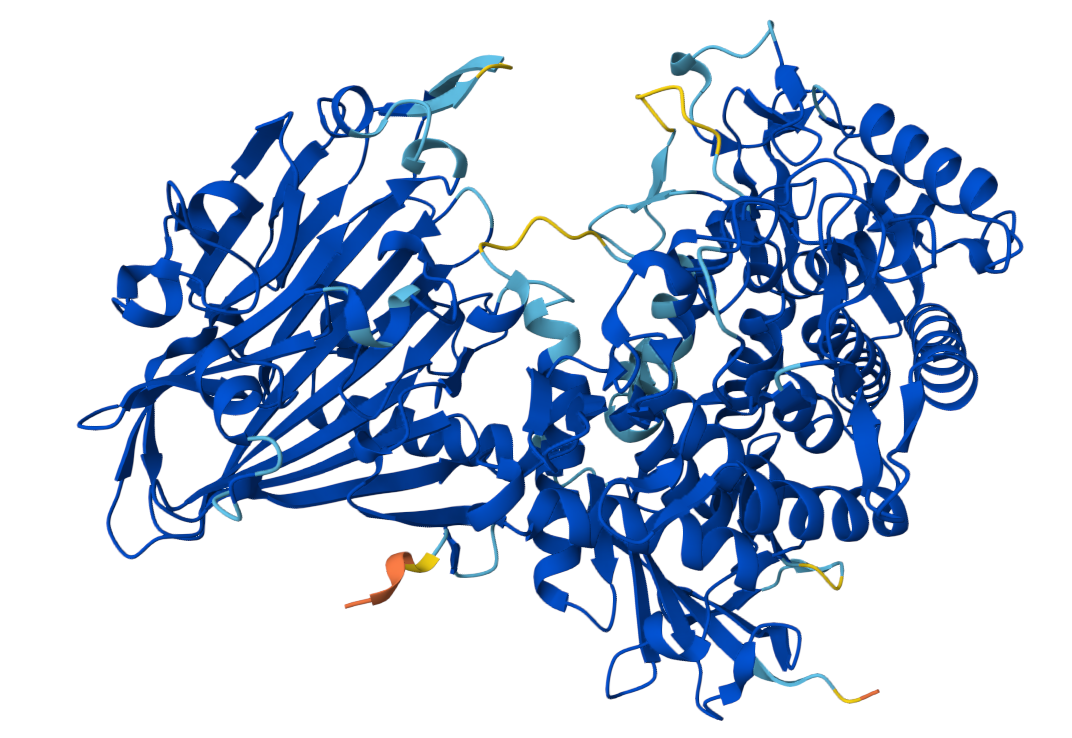
- 3D model of Laminaribiose phosphrylase protein

Identifiers
- EC no.: 2.4.1.31
- CAS no.: 37257-29-7

Databases
- IntEnz: IntEnz view
- BRENDA: BRENDA entry
- ExPASy: NiceZyme view
- KEGG: KEGG entry
- MetaCyc: metabolic pathway
- PRIAM: profile
- PDB structures: RCSB PDB PDBe PDBsum
- Gene Ontology: AmiGO / QuickGO
Search
- PMC: articles
- PubMed: articles
- NCBI: proteins

Laminaribiose phosphorylase (EC 2.4.1.31) is an enzyme coded for by the IbpA gene found in Paenibacillus. The enzyme catalyzes the chemical reaction

laminaribiose
P_{i}
P_{i}
α-D-glucose 1-phosphate
+
D-glucose

The two substrates of this enzyme are laminaribiose and orthophosphate (P_{i}). Its products are α-D-glucose 1-phosphate and D-glucose. It was originally characterised from Euglena gracilis and Astasia ocellata. The reaction can also proceed in the opposite direction, to give laminaribiose.

This enzyme belongs to the family of glycosyltransferases, specifically the hexosyltransferases. The systematic name of this enzyme class is 3-beta-D-glucosyl-D-glucose:phosphate alpha-D-glucosyltransferase.
