= Isomaltulose synthase =

Enzyme

isomaltulose synthase

Identifiers
- EC no.: 5.4.99.11
- CAS no.: 159940-49-5

Databases
- IntEnz: IntEnz view
- BRENDA: BRENDA entry
- ExPASy: NiceZyme view
- KEGG: KEGG entry
- MetaCyc: metabolic pathway
- PRIAM: profile
- PDB structures: RCSB PDB PDBe PDBsum
- Gene Ontology: AmiGO / QuickGO
Search
- PMC: articles
- PubMed: articles
- NCBI: proteins

In enzymology, an isomaltulose synthase (EC 5.4.99.11) is an enzyme that catalyzes the chemical reaction:

sucrose $\rightleftharpoons$ 6-O-Alpha-D-Glucopyranosyl-D-Fructofuranose

Hence, this enzyme has one substrate, sucrose (table sugar), and one product, 6-O-alpha-D-glucopyranosyl-D-fructofuranose (also known as isomaltulose or palatinose). It converts the α-1,2 glycosidic linkage between glucose and fructose in sucrose into the α-1,6 glycosidic linkage between glucose and fructose in isomaltulose.

This enzyme belongs to the family of isomerases. The systematic name of this enzyme class is sucrose glucosylmutase. Other names in common use include sucrose isomerase, sucrose alpha-glucosyltransferase, and trehalulose synthase.

The isomaltulose synthase of the bacterium Protaminobacter rubrum is commonly used in the industrial production of isomaltulose.

== Structural studies ==
As of late 2007, 7 structures have been solved for this class of enzymes, with PDB accession codes 1M53, 1ZJA, 1ZJB, 2PWD, 2PWE, 2PWF, and 2PWG.
