= Mannobiose =

Mannobiose can refer to:

- 2α-Mannobiose
- 3α-Mannobiose
