= Xylobiose =

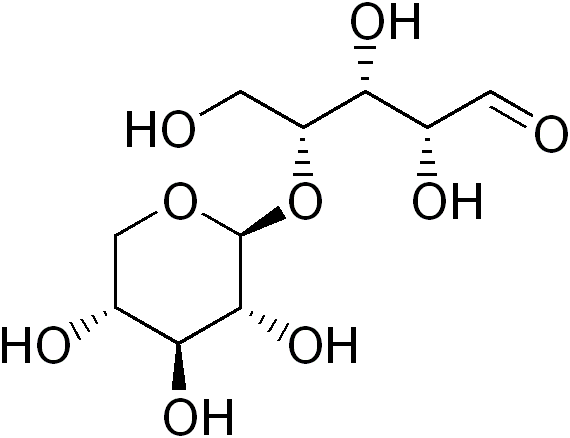

Names
- IUPAC name 4-O-β-D-Xylopyranosyl-D-xylose
- Systematic IUPAC name (2R,3R,4R)-2,3,5-Trihydroxy-4-[(2S,3R,4S,5R)-3,4,5-trihydroxyoxan-2-yl]oxypentanal

Identifiers
CAS Number	6860-47-5
3D model (JSmol)	Interactive image
ChemSpider	141332
MeSH	xylobiose
PubChem CID	160873
UNII	ID02R0EG7P
CompTox Dashboard (EPA)	DTXSID10905097
- InChI: InChI=1S/C10H18O9/c11-1-4(13)7(15)6(2-12)19-10-9(17)8(16)5(14)3-18-10/h1,4-10,12-17H,2-3H2/t4-,5+,6+,7+,8-,9+,10-/m0/s1 Key: SQNRKWHRVIAKLP-RSZZQXBVSA-N; InChI=1S/C10H18O9/c11-1-4(13)7(15)6(2-12)19-10-9(17)8(16)5(14)3-18-10/h1,4-10,12-17H,2-3H2/t4-,5+,6+,7+,8-,9+,10-/m0/s1; Key: SQNRKWHRVIAKLP-RSZZQXBVSA-N
- SMILES: C1[C@H]([C@@H]([C@H]([C@@H](O1)O[C@H](CO)[C@@H]([C@H](C=O)O)O)O)O)O

Properties
Chemical formula	C_{10}H_{18}O_{9}
Molar mass	282.24 g/mol
- Except where otherwise noted, data are given for materials in their standard state (at 25 °C [77 °F], 100 kPa). verify (what is ?) Infobox references

Xylobiose is a disaccharide of xylose monomers with a beta-1,4-bond between them.
