= 3α-Mannobiose =

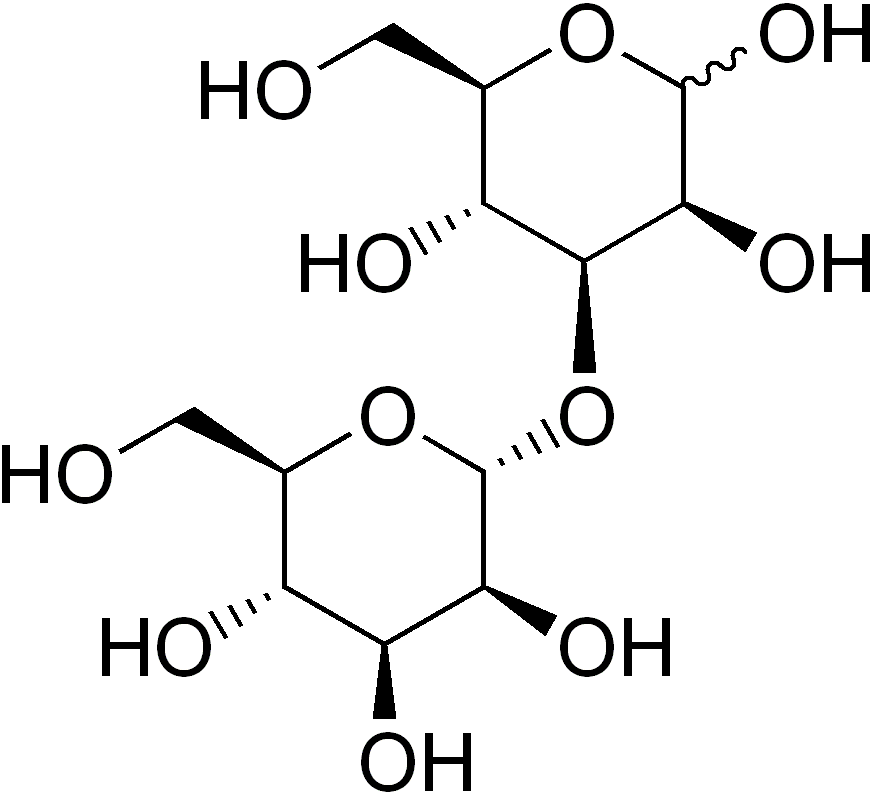

Names
- IUPAC name α-D-Mannopyranosyl-(1→3)-D-mannopyranose
- Systematic IUPAC name (2Ξ,3S,4S,5R,6R)-6-(Hydroxymethyl)-4-{[(2R,3S,4S,5S,6R)-3,4,5-trihydroxy-6-(hydroxymethyl)oxan-2-yl]oxy}oxane-2,3,5-triol
- Other names 3-O-α-D-Mannopyranosyl-D-mannose; α-D-Man-(1→3)-D-Man

Identifiers
CAS Number	23745-85-9
3D model (JSmol)	Interactive image; Interactive image
ChemSpider	9188472
PubChem CID	4195243
UNII	5YP9VS8BNU
- InChI: InChI=1S/C12H22O11/c13-1-3-5(15)7(17)8(18)12(22-3)23-10-6(16)4(2-14)21-11(20)9(10)19/h3-20H,1-2H2/t3-,4-,5-,6-,7+,8+,9+,10+,11?,12-/m1/s1 Key: QIGJYVCQYDKYDW-VXSGSMIHSA-N; InChI=1/C12H22O11/c13-1-3-5(15)7(17)8(18)12(22-3)23-10-6(16)4(2-14)21-11(20)9(10)19/h3-20H,1-2H2/t3-,4-,5-,6-,7+,8+,9+,10+,11?,12-/m1/s1 Key: QIGJYVCQYDKYDW-VXSGSMIHBP
- SMILES: OC[C@@H]1[C@@H](O)[C@H](O)[C@H](O)[C@@H](O[C@@H]2[C@H](O)C(O)O[C@H](CO)[C@H]2O)O1; C(C1C(C(C(C(O1)O)O)OC2C(C(C(C(O2)CO)O)O)O)O)O

Properties
Chemical formula	C_{12}H_{22}O_{11}
Molar mass	342.30 g/mol
- Except where otherwise noted, data are given for materials in their standard state (at 25 °C [77 °F], 100 kPa). verify (what is ?) Infobox references

3α-Mannobiose is a disaccharide composed of two mannose molecules connected by α(1→3) glycosidic bond.
