= Trehalulose =

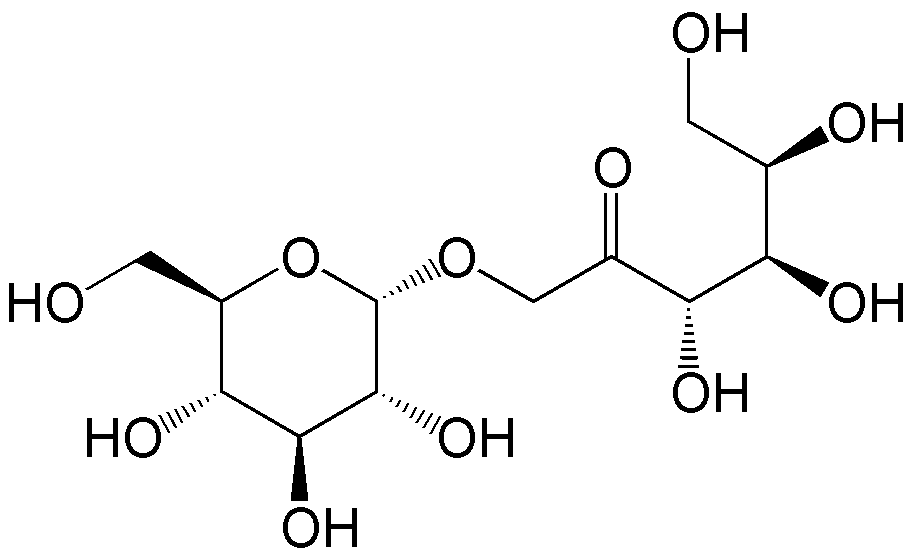

Names
- IUPAC name 1-O-α-D-Glucopyranosyl-D-fructose

Identifiers
CAS Number	51411-23-5
3D model (JSmol)	Interactive image
ChEBI	CHEBI:79284
ChemSpider	34448547
ECHA InfoCard	100.051.967
EC Number	257-183-7
KEGG	G01400
PubChem CID	162104
UNII	H39U51DD7Q
CompTox Dashboard (EPA)	DTXSID60965727
- InChI: InChI=1S/C12H22O11/c13-1-4(15)7(17)8(18)5(16)3-22-12-11(21)10(20)9(19)6(2-14)23-12/h4,6-15,17-21H,1-3H2/t4-,6-,7-,8-,9-,10+,11-,12+/m1/s1 Key: NMELTECMHKKXLF-DGQJZECASA-N
- SMILES: C(C1C(C(C(C(O1)OCC(=O)C(C(C(CO)O)O)O)O)O)O)O

Properties
Chemical formula	C_{12}H_{22}O_{11}
Molar mass	342.297 g·mol^{−1}
- Except where otherwise noted, data are given for materials in their standard state (at 25 °C [77 °F], 100 kPa). Infobox references

Trehalulose is a disaccharide made up of a molecule of fructose bound to a molecule of glucose. Like isomaltulose, it is a structural isomer of sucrose that is present in small quantities in honey. It makes up 50% of sugars in the honeydew of silverleaf whiteflies and is synthesised from sucrose by some bacteria, such as Protaminombacter rubrum. Because the anomeric carbon of the fructose moiety is not involved in the glycosidic bond, it is a reducing sugar.

== Physiology ==
Because the fructose and glucose molecules are linked by a 1,1 glycosidic bond, which is more stable than the 1,2 glycosidic bond in sucrose, it is broken down more slowly than sucrose in the small intestine, giving it a lower glycemic index. This more stable bond also means that it cannot be utilised by Streptococcus mutans, and it is therefore non-cariogenic.

== Properties ==
Unlike isomaltulose, trehalulose strongly resists crystallisation, and forms an amorphous solid when dried. Its sweetness relative to sucrose has been estimated as between 0.4 and 0.7.

It has a specific rotation of $[\alpha]_D^{20} = +50$°.

== Honey from stingless bees ==
In 2020 researchers at the University of Queensland found that some species of stingless bee in Australia, Malaysia, and Brazil produce honey containing between 13% and 44% trehalulose rather than the usual glucose and fructose. The university's findings supported the long-standing claims of Indigenous Australian people that native honey is beneficial for human health. In 2021 the same researchers discovered that the bees convert all sucrose from nectar into trehalulose.
