= Sophorose =

Names
- IUPAC names β-D-Glucopyranosyl-(1→2)-α-D-glucopyranose; 2-O-β-D-Glucopyranosyl-α-D-glucopyranose
- Systematic IUPAC name (2S,3R,4S,5S,6R)-2-(hydroxymethyl)-6-[(2S,3R,4S,5S,6R)-2,4,5-trihydroxy-6-(hydroxymethyl)oxan-3-yl]oxyoxane-3,4,5-triol (alpha-Sophorose)
- Other names 2-O-beta-D-Glucopyranosyl-alpha-D-glucose

Identifiers
CAS Number	534-46-3
3D model (JSmol)	Interactive image
ChEBI	CHEBI:1230
ChemSpider	80053
ECHA InfoCard	100.040.072
PubChem CID	88719
UNII	ZHQ3C30OP1
CompTox Dashboard (EPA)	DTXSID70190649
- InChI: InChI=1S/C12H22O11/c13-1-3-6(16)8(18)10(11(20)21-3)23-12-9(19)7(17)5(15)4(2-14)22-12/h3-20H,1-2H2/t3-,4-,5-,6-,7+,8+,9-,10-,11+,12+/m1/s1 Key: HIWPGCMGAMJNRG-NCFXGAEVSA-N; InChI=1/C12H22O11/c13-1-3-6(16)8(18)10(11(20)21-3)23-12-9(19)7(17)5(15)4(2-14)22-12/h3-20H,1-2H2/t3-,4-,5-,6-,7+,8+,9-,10-,11+,12+/m1/s1 Key: HIWPGCMGAMJNRG-NCFXGAEVBZ
- SMILES: C([C@@H]1[C@H]([C@@H]([C@H]([C@H](O1)O)O[C@H]2[C@@H]([C@H]([C@@H]([C@H](O2)CO)O)O)O)O)O)O

Properties
Chemical formula	C_{12}H_{22}O_{11}
Molar mass	342.30 g/mol
Density	1.768 g/mL
- Except where otherwise noted, data are given for materials in their standard state (at 25 °C [77 °F], 100 kPa). verify (what is ?) Infobox references

Sophorose is a disaccharide, a dimer of glucose. It differs from other glucose dimers such as maltose in having an unusual β-1,2 bond. It was isolated in 1938 from pods of Sophora japonica. It is a component of sophorolipids. It is a product of the caramelization of glucose.
