= Turanose =

d-Turanose

Names
- IUPAC name α-D-glucopyranosyl-(1→3)-α-D-fructofuranose
- Systematic IUPAC name (3S,4R,5R)-1,4,5,6-tetrahydroxy-3-[(2R,3R,4S,5S,6R)-3,4,5-trihydroxy-6-(hydroxymethyl)oxan-2-yl]oxyhexan-2-one

Identifiers
CAS Number	547-25-1
3D model (JSmol)	Interactive image
ChemSpider	4574343
ECHA InfoCard	100.008.108
MeSH	turanose
PubChem CID	5460935
UNII	6D600ARY3R
CompTox Dashboard (EPA)	DTXSID90876998
- InChI: InChI=1S/C12H22O11/c13-1-4(16)7(18)11(5(17)2-14)23-12-10(21)9(20)8(19)6(3-15)22-12/h4,6-16,18-21H,1-3H2/t4-,6-,7-,8-,9+,10-,11-,12-/m1/s1 Key: RULSWEULPANCDV-PIXUTMIVSA-N; InChI=1/C12H22O11/c13-1-4(16)7(18)11(5(17)2-14)23-12-10(21)9(20)8(19)6(3-15)22-12/h4,6-16,18-21H,1-3H2/t4-,6-,7-,8-,9+,10-,11-,12-/m1/s1 Key: RULSWEULPANCDV-PIXUTMIVBJ
- SMILES: O=C([C@@H](O[C@H]1O[C@@H]([C@@H](O)[C@H](O)[C@H]1O)CO)[C@H](O)[C@H](O)CO)CO

Properties
Chemical formula	C_{12}H_{22}O_{11}
Molar mass	342.30 g/mol
- Except where otherwise noted, data are given for materials in their standard state (at 25 °C [77 °F], 100 kPa). verify (what is ?) Infobox references

Turanose is a reducing disaccharide. The d-isomer is naturally occurring. Its systematic name is α-d-glucopyranosyl-(1→3)-α-d-fructofuranose. It is an analog of sucrose not metabolized by higher plants, but rather acquired through the action of sucrose transporters for intracellular carbohydrate signaling. In addition to its involvement in signal transduction, d-(+)-turanose can also be used as a carbon source by many organisms including numerous species of bacteria and fungi.
