= Erythritol =

Sugar alcohol that is used as a sweetener

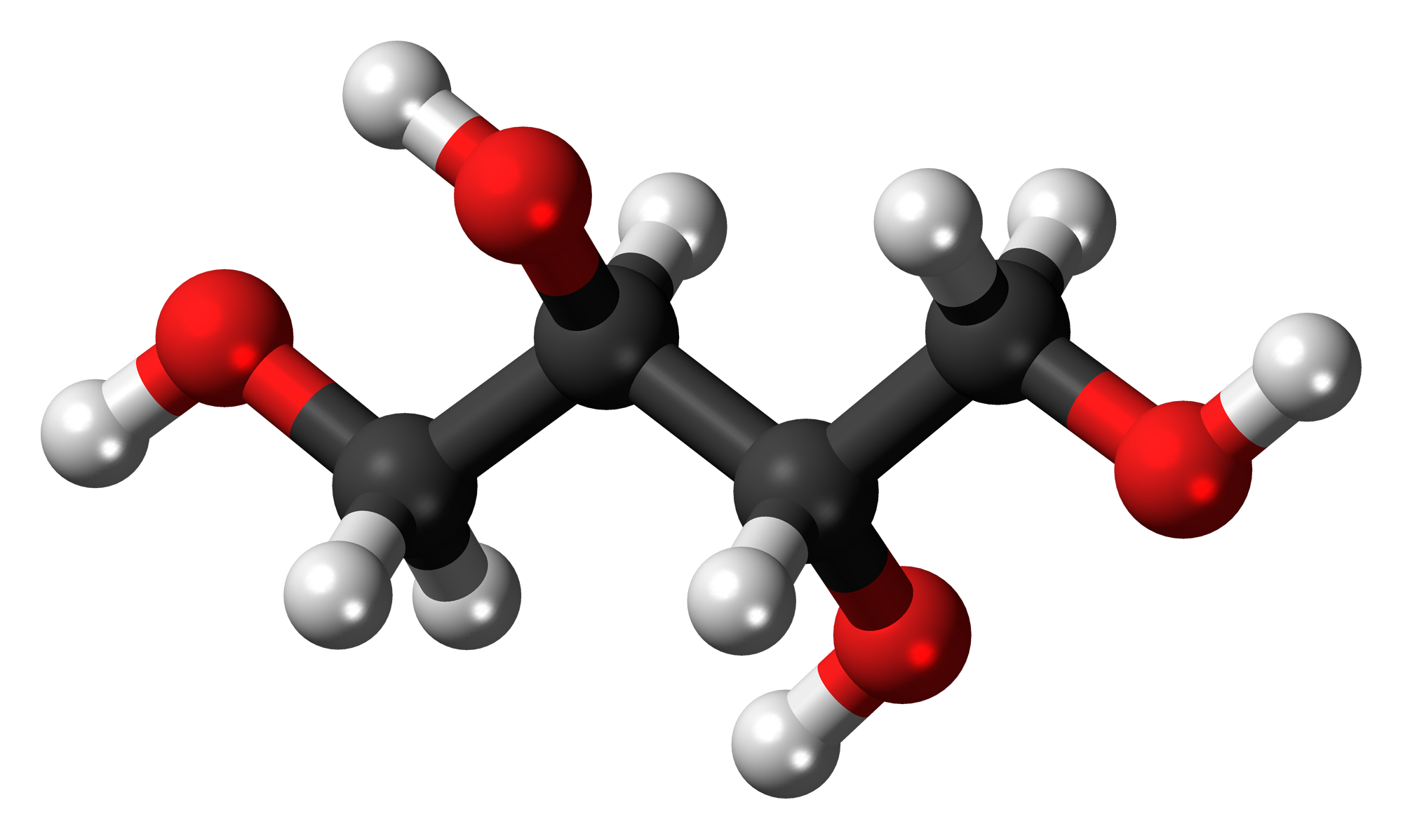

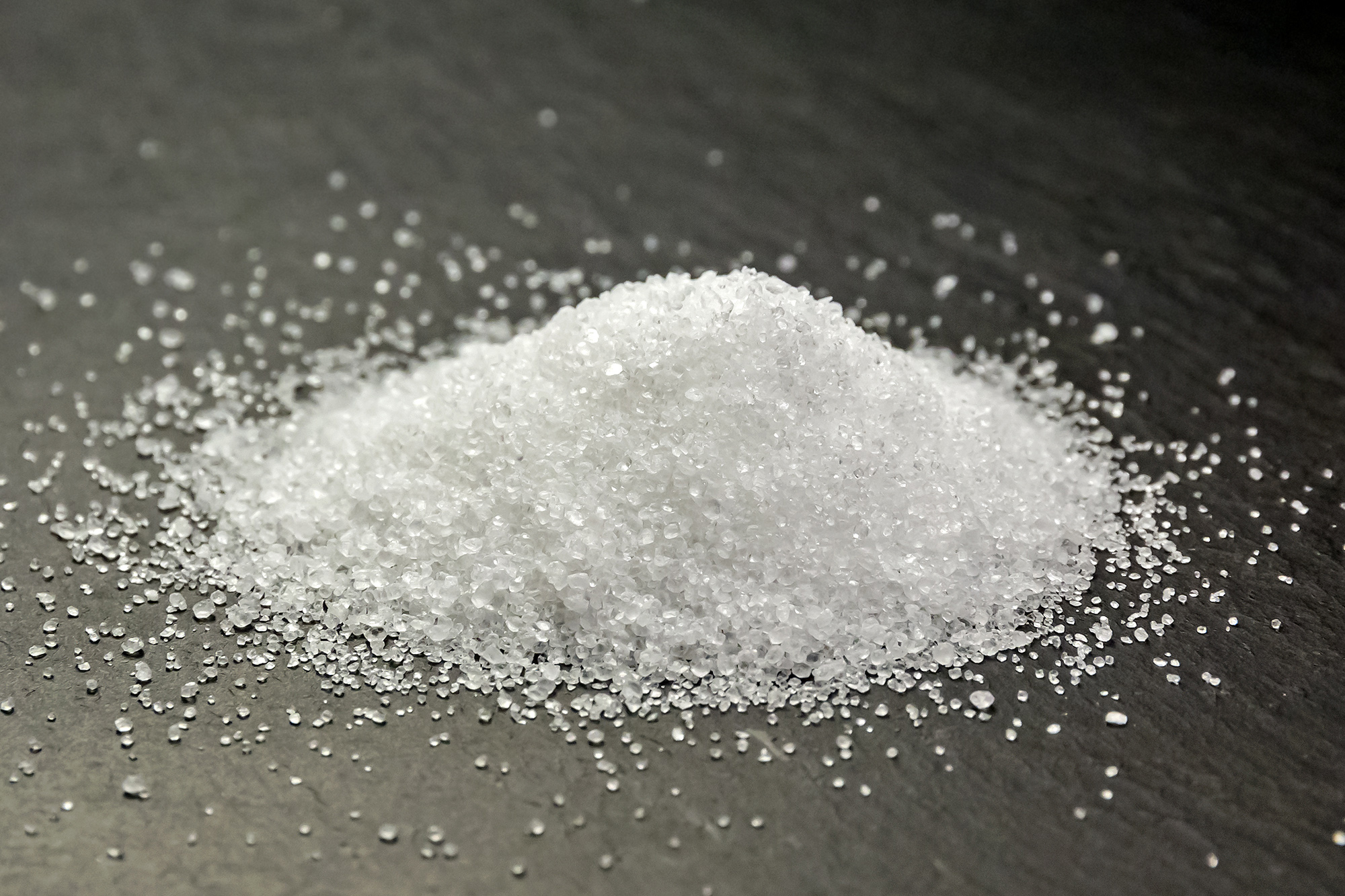

Names
- IUPAC name meso-Erythritol
- Systematic IUPAC name (2R,3S)-Butane-1,2,3,4-tetrol
- Other names (2R,3S)-Butane-1,2,3,4-tetraol (not recommended)

Identifiers
CAS Number	149-32-6
3D model (JSmol)	Interactive image; Interactive image
Beilstein Reference	1719753
ChEBI	CHEBI:17113
ChEMBL	ChEMBL349605
ChemSpider	192963
DrugBank	DB04481
ECHA InfoCard	100.005.217
E number	E968 (glazing agents, ...)
Gmelin Reference	82499
KEGG	D08915
PubChem CID	222285
UNII	RA96B954X6
CompTox Dashboard (EPA)	DTXSID6043919
- InChI: InChI=1S/C4H10O4/c5-1-3(7)4(8)2-6/h3-8H,1-2H2/t3-,4+ Key: UNXHWFMMPAWVPI-ZXZARUISSA-N; InChI=1/C4H10O4/c5-1-3(7)4(8)2-6/h3-8H,1-2H2/t3-,4+ Key: UNXHWFMMPAWVPI-ZXZARUISBN
- SMILES: OC[C@@H](O)[C@@H](O)CO; C([C@H]([C@H](CO)O)O)O

Properties
Chemical formula	C_{4}H_{10}O_{4}
Molar mass	122.120 g·mol^{−1}
Density	1.45 g/cm^{3}
Melting point	121 °C (250 °F; 394 K)
Boiling point	329 to 331 °C (624 to 628 °F; 602 to 604 K)
Solubility in water	61% w/w (25 °C)
Magnetic susceptibility (χ)	−73.80·10^{−6} cm^{3}/mol

Hazards
NFPA 704 (fire diamond)	1 1 0
- Except where otherwise noted, data are given for materials in their standard state (at 25 °C [77 °F], 100 kPa). verify (what is ?) Infobox references

Erythritol (/ɪˈrɪθrɪtɒl/, US: /-tɔːl, -toʊl/) is an organic compound, the naturally occurring achiral meso four-carbon sugar alcohol (or polyol). It is the reduced form of either D- or L-erythrose and one of the two reduced forms of erythrulose. It is used as a food additive and sugar substitute. It is synthesized from corn using enzymes and fermentation. Its formula is C_{4}H_{10}O_{4}, or HO(CH_{2})(CHOH)_{2}(CH_{2})OH.

Erythritol is 60–70% as sweet as table sugar, being of a similar taste to sucrose. However, erythritol is almost completely noncaloric and does not affect blood sugar or cause tooth decay. Japanese companies pioneered the commercial development of erythritol as a sweetener in the 1990s.

== Etymology ==
The name "erythritol" derives from the Greek word for the color red (erythros or ἐρυθρός). The name is adapted from a closely related compound, erythrin, which turns red upon oxidation. Despite its name, erythritol is almost always found in the form of white crystals or powder, and chemical reactions do not turn it red.

== History ==
Erythritol was discovered in 1848 by the Scottish chemist John Stenhouse and first isolated in 1852.

Starting from 1945, American chemists applied newly-developed techniques of chromatography to sugarcane juice and blackstrap molasses, finding in 1950 that erythritol was present in molasses fermented by yeast.

It was first approved and marketed as a sweetener in Japan in 1990, and in the US in 1997. In February 1997, Cerestar Holding Co., Mitsubishi Chemical Co., and Nikken Chemicals Co. submitted a formal generally recognized as safe (GRAS) affirmation petition with the US FDA. However, in April 1997 the FDA replaced the GRAS affirmation petition process with the current GRAS notification process, a notice was first filed by Cerestar in April 2001, and the FDA responded with "no questions" in September 2001.

== Occurrence ==
Erythritol occurs naturally in some fruits (watermelons, pears, and grapes in minimal amounts), as well as mushrooms, and in fungus-fermented foods. Certain microorganisms also produce erythritol naturally as an osmoprotectant, working with other solutes to regulate internal osmotic pressure.

== Uses ==
Since 1990, erythritol has had a history of safe use as a sweetener and flavor-enhancer in food and beverage products and is approved for use by government regulatory agencies in more than 60 countries.

Beverage categories for its use are coffee and tea, liquid dietary supplements, juice blends, soft drinks, and flavored water product variations, with foods including confections, biscuits and cookies, tabletop sweeteners, and sugar-free chewing gum. The mild sweetness of erythritol allows for a volume-for-volume replacement of sugar, whereas sweeter sugar substitutes need fillers that result in a noticeably different texture in baked products. Erythritol is also used as a humectant.

== Absorption and excretion ==
Erythritol is absorbed rapidly into the blood, with peak amounts occurring in under two hours; the majority of an oral dose (80–90%) is excreted unchanged in the urine within 24 hours. Erythritol is of a lower molecular weight than most non-caloric sweeteners, leading to a faster absorption rate into the small intestine via size-dependent passive diffusion.

== Safety ==
In 2023, the European Food Safety Authority reassessed the safety of erythritol and lowered the recommended daily intake limit to 0.5 grams per kg body weight, which equates to 35 g for an average adult (70 kg). The lower limit was set to "safeguard against its laxative effect and to mitigate against long-term effects, such as electrolyte imbalance arising from prolonged exposure to erythritol-induced diarrhea."

Previously, in 2015, scientists assessed doses for erythritol where symptoms of mild gastrointestinal upset occurred, such as nausea, excess flatus, abdominal bloating or pain, and stool frequency. At a content of 1.6% in beverages, it was not considered to have a laxative effect. The upper limit of tolerance was 0.78 and 0.71 g/kg body weight in adults and children respectively.

In the United States, erythritol is among several sugar alcohols that are generally recognized as safe (GRAS) for food manufacturing.

== Dietary and metabolic aspects ==
=== Caloric value and labeling ===
Nutritional labeling of erythritol in food products varies from country to country. Some places, such as Japan and the European Union (EU), label it as zero-calorie.

Under Food and Drug Administration (FDA) labeling requirements in the United States, erythritol has a caloric value of zero.

=== Human digestion ===
In the body, most erythritol is absorbed into the bloodstream in the small intestine and then for the most part excreted unchanged in the urine. About 10% enters the colon.

In small doses, erythritol does not normally cause laxative effects and gas or bloating, as are often experienced after consumption of other sugar alcohols (such as maltitol, sorbitol, xylitol, and lactitol). About 90% is absorbed before it enters the large intestine, and since erythritol is not digested by intestinal bacteria, the remaining 10% is excreted in the feces.

Large doses can cause nausea, stomach rumbling, and watery feces. Doses greater than 0.66 g/kg body weight in males and greater than 0.8 g/kg body weight in females cause laxation, and doses over 50 grams (1.8 oz) cause diarrhea. Rarely, erythritol can cause allergic hives (urticaria).

=== Blood sugar and insulin levels ===
Erythritol has no effect on blood sugar or blood insulin levels, and therefore may be used as a sugar substitute by people with type 2 diabetes. The glycemic index (GI) of erythritol is 0% of the GI for glucose and the insulin index (II) is 2% of the II for glucose.

=== Oral bacteria ===
Erythritol is tooth-friendly; since it cannot be metabolized by oral bacteria, it does not contribute to tooth decay. In addition, erythritol, like xylitol, has antibacterial effects against streptococci bacteria, reduces dental plaque, and may be protective against tooth decay. There is evidence that erythritol is a more effective at reducing tooth decay than other non-caloric sweeteners. A comparison of dental caries formed after consumption of candy made with erythritol, sorbitol, and xylitol showed erythritol to have the most significant reduction in fresh plaque weight.

== Manufacturing ==
Erythritol can be produced by enzymatic hydrolysis of the starch from corn to generate glucose. Glucose is then fermented with yeast or another fungus to produce erythritol.

Because production through chemical synthesis is commercially not profitable, industrial production is biotechnologically done by fermentation of sugar with a genetically engineered strain of the yeast Yarrowia lipolytica. Alternatively, glycerol may be used as a carbon source and high osmotic pressure to increase yields up to 62%.

== Chemical properties ==
=== Heat of solution ===
Erythritol has a strong cooling effect (endothermic, or positive heat of solution) when it dissolves in water, which is often compared with the cooling effect of mint flavors. The cooling effect is present only when erythritol is not already dissolved in water, a situation that might be experienced in an erythritol-sweetened frosting, chocolate bar, chewing gum, or hard candy. The cooling effect of erythritol is very similar to that of xylitol and among the strongest cooling effects of all sugar alcohols. Erythritol has a pK_{a} of 13.903 at 18 °C.

== Biological properties ==
According to a 2014 study, erythritol functions as an insecticide toxic to the fruit fly Drosophila melanogaster, impairing motor ability and reducing longevity even when nutritive sugars were available.

Erythritol is preferentially used by the Brucella spp. The presence of erythritol in the placentas of goats, cattle, and pigs has been proposed as an explanation for the accumulation of Brucella bacteria found at these sites.

== Synonyms ==
In the 19th and the early 20th centuries, several synonyms were in use for erythritol: erythrol, erythrite, erythroglucin, eryglucin, erythromannite and phycite. Zerose is a tradename for erythritol.

== See also ==
- Erythritol tetranitrate
- Pentaerythritol
- Threitol, the diastereomer of erythritol
