= Toothfriendly International =

Oral health organisation

"Toothfriendly" label

Toothfriendly International is a non-profit association which was established in 1989 in Basel, Switzerland. The purpose of the association is to advance oral health, particularly through preventive measures which include regular oral hygiene (toothbrushing with a fluoridated toothpaste), appropriate dietary habits (avoidance of frequent intake of sugary foods) and regular check-ups by a dentist. It is governed by an executive board of dental professionals.

Since 1989, Toothfriendly International grants the rights for the Toothfriendly quality mark. The Toothfriendly label distinguishes products that are demonstrably not harmful for teeth. The association has national groups in Switzerland, Germany, Turkey, Japan, Korea and Thailand.

The members of the organization are dental professionals, dental and public health institutions, confectionery and oral care manufacturers.
