= 2α-Mannobiose =

Names
- IUPAC name α-D-Mannopyranosyl-(1→2)-D-mannopyranose
- Systematic IUPAC name (2Ξ,3S,4S,5S,6R)-6-(Hydroxymethyl)-2-{[(2R,3S,4S,5S,6R)-3,4,5-trihydroxy-6-(hydroxymethyl)oxan-2-yl]oxy}oxane-2,4,5-triol

Identifiers
CAS Number	15548-39-7
3D model (JSmol)	Interactive image; Interactive image
ChemSpider	9275088
PubChem CID	11099946
UNII	JSS99DM8F7
CompTox Dashboard (EPA)	DTXSID60455214
- InChI: InChI=1S/C12H22O11/c13-1-3-6(16)8(18)10(11(20)21-3)23-12-9(19)7(17)5(15)4(2-14)22-12/h3-20H,1-2H2/t3-,4-,5-,6-,7+,8+,9+,10+,11?,12-/m1/s1 Key: HIWPGCMGAMJNRG-VXSGSMIHSA-N; InChI=1/C12H22O11/c13-1-3-6(16)8(18)10(11(20)21-3)23-12-9(19)7(17)5(15)4(2-14)22-12/h3-20H,1-2H2/t3-,4-,5-,6-,7+,8+,9+,10+,11?,12-/m1/s1 Key: HIWPGCMGAMJNRG-VXSGSMIHBW
- SMILES: OC[C@@H]1[C@@H](O)[C@H](O)[C@H](O)[C@@H](O[C@H](C(O)O[C@H](CO)[C@H]2O)[C@H]2O)O1; C(C1C(C(C(C(O1)O)OC2C(C(C(C(O2)CO)O)O)O)O)O)O

Properties
Chemical formula	C_{12}H_{22}O_{11}
Molar mass	342.30 g/mol
- Except where otherwise noted, data are given for materials in their standard state (at 25 °C [77 °F], 100 kPa). verify (what is ?) Infobox references

2α-Mannobiose is a disaccharide. It is formed by a condensation reaction, when two mannose molecules react together, in the formation of a glycosidic bond.
