= Melibiose =

Names
- IUPAC names α-D-Galactopyranosyl-(1→6)-D-glucopyranose; 6-O-α-D-Galactopyranosyl-β-D-glucopyranose
- Systematic IUPAC name (2R,3R,4S,5S,6R)-6-{{#parsoidfragment:0}}(2S,3R,4S,5R,6R)-3,4,5-trihydroxy-6-(hydroxymethyl)oxan-2-yl]oxymethyl]oxane-2,3,4,5-tetrol

Identifiers
CAS Number	585-99-9
3D model (JSmol)	Interactive image
ChEBI	CHEBI:28053
ChEMBL	ChEMBL1159652
ChemSpider	10974
ECHA InfoCard	100.008.700
MeSH	Melibiose
PubChem CID	11458
UNII	9B1VBE526I
- InChI: InChI=1S/C12H22O11/c13-1-3-5(14)8(17)10(19)12(23-3)21-2-4-6(15)7(16)9(18)11(20)22-4/h3-20H,1-2H2/t3-,4-,5+,6-,7+,8+,9-,10-,11-,12+/m1/s1 Key: DLRVVLDZNNYCBX-ZZFZYMBESA-N
- SMILES: C([C@@H]1[C@@H]([C@@H]([C@H]([C@H](O1)OC[C@@H]2[C@H]([C@@H]([C@H]([C@@H](O2)O)O)O)O)O)O)O)O

Properties
Chemical formula	C_{12}H_{22}O_{11}
Molar mass	342.297 g·mol^{−1}
Melting point	84–85 °C (183–185 °F; 357–358 K)
- Except where otherwise noted, data are given for materials in their standard state (at 25 °C [77 °F], 100 kPa). verify (what is ?) Infobox references

Melibiose is a reducing disaccharide formed by an α-1,6 linkage between galactose and glucose (D-Gal-(α1→6)-D-Glc). It differs from lactose in the chirality of the carbon where the galactose ring is closed and that the galactose is linked to a different point on the glucose moiety. It can be formed by invertase-mediated hydrolysis of raffinose, which produces melibiose and fructose. Melibiose can be broken down into its component saccharides, glucose and galactose, by the enzyme alpha-galactosidase, such as MEL1 from Saccharomyces pastorianus (lager yeast).

Melibiose cannot be used by Saccharomyces cerevisiae (ale yeast), so this is one test to differentiate between the two yeast species.
