= Laminaribiose =

Names
- IUPAC name 3-β-D-Glucopyranosyl-(1→3)-D-glucose
- Systematic IUPAC name (2R,3S,4R,5R)-2,4,5,6-Tetrahydroxy-3-{[(2S,3R,4S,5S,6R)-3,4,5-trihydroxy-6-(hydroxymethyl)oxan-2-yl]oxy}hexanal
- Other names 3-β-D-Glucosyl-D-glucose

Identifiers
CAS Number	34980-39-7
3D model (JSmol)	Interactive image
ChemSpider	388710
PubChem CID	439637
UNII	0WN3D69UW4
- InChI: InChI=1S/C12H22O11/c13-1-3-5(15)7(17)8(18)12(22-3)23-10-6(16)4(2-14)21-11(20)9(10)19/h3-20H,1-2H2/t3-,4-,5-,6-,7+,8-,9-,10+,11?,12+/m1/s1 Key: QIGJYVCQYDKYDW-LCOYTZNXSA-N
- SMILES: O([C@H]1[C@H](O)[C@H](OC(O)[C@@H]1O)CO)[C@@H]2O[C@H](CO)[C@@H](O)[C@H](O)[C@H]2O

Properties
Chemical formula	C_{12}H_{22}O_{11}
Molar mass	342.30 g/mol
Density	1.768 g/mL
- Except where otherwise noted, data are given for materials in their standard state (at 25 °C [77 °F], 100 kPa). Infobox references

Laminaribiose C_{12}H_{22}O_{11} is a disaccharide which is used notably in the agricultural field and as an antiseptic. It is in general obtained by hydrolysis or by acetolysis of natural polysaccharides of plant origin. It is also a product of the caramelization of glucose.

== Biosynthesis ==
In some plants, the enzyme laminaribiose phosphorylase catalyzes a reversible chemical reaction that produces laminaribiose from α-D-glucose 1-phosphate and D-glucose:

α-D-glucose 1-phosphate
+
D-glucose
P_{i}
P_{i}
laminaribiose

The enzyme has been found in Euglena gracilis and Astasia ocellata.
