= Nigerose =

Names
- IUPAC name 3-O-α-D-Glucopyranosyl-D-glucopyranose
- Systematic IUPAC name (2R,3S,4S,5R,6R)-2-(Hydroxymethyl)-6-[(3R,4S,5R,6R)-2,3,5-trihydroxy-6-(hydroxymethyl)oxan-4-yl]oxyoxane-3,4,5-triol

Identifiers
CAS Number	497-48-3
3D model (JSmol)	Interactive image
ChemSpider	388607
MeSH	Nigerose
PubChem CID	439512
CompTox Dashboard (EPA)	DTXSID70331419
- InChI: InChI=1S/C12H22O11/c13-1-3-5(15)7(17)8(18)12(22-3)23-10-6(16)4(2-14)21-11(20)9(10)19/h3-20H,1-2H2/t3-,4-,5-,6-,7+,8-,9-,10+,11?,12-/m1/s1 Key: QIGJYVCQYDKYDW-NSYYTRPSSA-N; InChI=1/C12H22O11/c13-1-3-5(15)7(17)8(18)12(22-3)23-10-6(16)4(2-14)21-11(20)9(10)19/h3-20H,1-2H2/t3-,4-,5-,6-,7+,8-,9-,10+,11?,12-/m1/s1 Key: QIGJYVCQYDKYDW-NSYYTRPSBG
- SMILES: O([C@H]1[C@H](O)[C@H](OC(O)[C@@H]1O)CO)[C@H]2O[C@@H]([C@@H](O)[C@H](O)[C@H]2O)CO

Properties
Chemical formula	C_{12}H_{22}O_{11}
Molar mass	342.29648
- Except where otherwise noted, data are given for materials in their standard state (at 25 °C [77 °F], 100 kPa). verify (what is ?) Infobox references

Nigerose, also known as sakebiose, is an unfermentable sugar obtained by partial hydrolysis of nigeran, a polysaccharide found in black mold, but is also readily extracted from the dextrans found in rice molds and many other fermenting microorganisms, such as L. mesenteroides. It is a disaccharide made of two glucose residues, connected with a 1->3 link. It is a product of the caramelization of glucose.
