= Isomaltulose =

Names
- IUPAC name 6-O-α-D-Glucopyranosyl-D-fructose
- Other names Palatinose

Identifiers
CAS Number	13718-94-0; 58024-13-8 (monohydrate)
3D model (JSmol)	Interactive image
ChemSpider	75509
ECHA InfoCard	100.033.878
EC Number	237-282-1
PubChem CID	83686
UNII	V59P50X4UY; 43360LXH8N (monohydrate)
CompTox Dashboard (EPA)	DTXSID90929736
- InChI: InChI=1S/C12H22O11/c13-1-4(15)7(17)8(18)5(16)3-22-12-11(21)10(20)9(19)6(2-14)23-12/h5-14,16-21H,1-3H2/t5-,6-,7-,8-,9-,10+,11-,12+/m1/s1 Key: RJPPRBMGVWEZRR-WTZPKTTFSA-N; InChI=1/C12H22O11/c13-1-4(15)7(17)8(18)5(16)3-22-12-11(21)10(20)9(19)6(2-14)23-12/h5-14,16-21H,1-3H2/t5-,6-,7-,8-,9-,10+,11-,12+/m1/s1 Key: RJPPRBMGVWEZRR-WTZPKTTFBY
- SMILES: O=C(CO)[C@@H](O)[C@H](O)[C@H](O)CO[C@H]1O[C@@H]([C@@H](O)[C@H](O)[C@H]1O)CO

Properties
Chemical formula	C_{12}H_{22}O_{11}
Molar mass	342.297 g·mol^{−1}
- Except where otherwise noted, data are given for materials in their standard state (at 25 °C [77 °F], 100 kPa). verify (what is ?) Infobox references

Isomaltulose (trade name Palatinose, chemical name 6-O-α-D-glucopyranosyl-D-fructose) is a disaccharide carbohydrate composed of glucose and fructose. It is naturally present in honey and sugarcane extracts and is also produced industrially from table sugar (sucrose) and used as a sugar alternative.

It tastes similar to table sugar with half the sweetness. It has the same energy as table sugar, but is digested slower and thus leads to a lower blood glucose and insulin response. In comparison with sucrose and most other carbohydrates, isomaltulose is not a significant substrate for oral bacteria. Consequently, acid production from isomaltulose in the mouth is too slow to promote tooth decay. Its physical properties closely resemble those of sucrose, making it easy to use in existing recipes and processes.

It is manufactured by enzymatic rearrangement (isomerization) of sucrose from beet sugar. Since the 1950s its physiological role and physical properties have been studied extensively. Isomaltulose has been used as an alternative to sugar in foods in Japan since 1985, in the EU since 2005, in the US since 2006, and in Australia and New Zealand since 2007, besides other countries worldwide.

Like sucrose, isomaltulose can be digested to glucose and fructose. However, while in sucrose the glucose is linked to the anomeric carbon of the fructose (an α-1,2 glycosidic linkage), in isomaltulose the linkage is to the 6 carbon (α-1,6), making isomaltulose a reducing sugar, unlike sucrose. The fructose in isomaltulose exists in a ring structure that readily opens to exhibit a carbonyl group as in ketones and aldehydes, which explains why isomaltulose is a reducing sugar.

Isomaltulose is hydrogenated to produce isomalt, a minimally digestible carbohydrate that is used as a sugar replacer, for example in sugar-free candies and confectionery.

== Function ==
In nutrition, isomaltulose is a source of food energy, providing the same amount of energy as sucrose. Like sucrose, isomaltulose provides sweetness to foods, but isomaltulose is only about half as sweet as sucrose. In food preparation and processing, both isomaltulose and sucrose have similar characteristics allowing recipes that use sucrose able to use isomaltulose instead or together.

=== Available carbohydrate ===
Isomaltulose is an available carbohydrate like sucrose and most other sugars or maltodextrins, in the sense that it is fully metabolised in the small intestine, and does not enter the large intestine or get excreted in urine.

When eaten by humans, isomaltulose is digested completely and absorbed. Its intestinal digestion involves the enzyme isomaltase, which is located at the surface of the brush border lining the inner wall of the small intestine. This enzyme is otherwise involved in the digestion of α-1,6 linkages present in starch. The products of isomaltulose digestion are glucose and fructose, which are absorbed and enter the bloodstream. Once absorbed, the glucose and fructose follow the same metabolic pathways through the body as if they were derived from sucrose. While fructose is mostly converted to glucose or glycogen stores in the liver, glucose from the small intestine and liver is distributed via the circulatory system to different parts of the body where it serves cellular metabolism as an energy source directly or indirectly after storage as glycogen in the tissues of the body, especially in skeletal muscle.

=== Source of energy ===
As an available carbohydrate, the food energy value of isomaltulose is identical to that of sucrose. For both, it is 4 kcal/g (17 kJ/g), a value that is used in food labelling or dietary planning.

=== Slow and sustained release of carbohydrate and energy ===
Isomaltulose is slow to be digested and absorbed, and is therefore gradually released as glucose and fructose into the bloodstream. After ingestion, the enzymatic digestion of sucrose and isomaltulose occur on the same sucrase-isomaltase enzyme complex, which is located in the small intestine. Several studies show that this complex breaks down isomaltulose more slowly than sucrose. The maximum rate at which isomaltase can process isomaltulose (V_{max}) is 4.5 times lower than that of sucrase for sucrose.

As a result of its slow digestion, isomaltulose travels further through the human small intestine than sucrose does, as evidenced by the difference in incretin responses they elicit. Compared to sucrose, isomaltulose leads to lower secretion of the incretin hormone GIP (glucose-dependent insulinotropic polypeptide), which is released from the upper (proximal) part of the small intestine. In contrast, it triggers higher secretion of the incretin hormone GLP-1 (glucagon-like peptide-1), which is released from the lower (distal) part of the small intestine.

Compared with sucrose, the absorption of energy as carbohydrate from isomaltulose is prolonged. The resulting sustained energy supply to the body from isomaltulose is reflected in the prolonged shape of the blood glucose concentration response curve.

=== Lower blood glucose and insulin response ===
The blood glucose and insulin concentrations after ingestion of isomaltulose are lower than those due to sucrose or glucose, giving isomaltulose a glycemic index (GI) of 32 as recorded in the Sydney University GI database, compared to 67 for sucrose and 100 for glucose, making isomaltulose a particularly low-GI carbohydrate (GI<55).

Confirmation of a low glycaemic response to isomaltulose is provided in numerous studies for different population groups including healthy people, overweight or obese persons, prediabetic persons, and type 1 or type 2 diabetes patients. Among these studies, all show the lower blood glucose response of isomaltulose and where tested also show the associated reduction in the blood insulin response. A significant role for the incretin hormone GLP-1 has been established, which is secreted in response to distal carbohydrate absorption and limits the rise in blood glucose concentration after a meal.

A claim corresponding to the low glycemic response of isomaltulose and its potential to lower the blood glucose response to foods when replacing other sugars has been approved in EU legislation following the publication of a positive opinion from the European Food Safety Authority.

In the long term, when eating a diet including carbohydrate, avoiding undesirably high concentrations of glucose in blood and the associated demand for insulin, is supportive of the prevention and management of diabetes mellitus, cardiovascular disease, and possibly overweight and obesity—as indicated by the International Carbohydrate Quality Consortium consensus of expert nutrition scientists. Continuous monitoring of 24-h blood glucose concentration following diets including isomaltulose instead of sucrose lowers the blood glucose profile over the day, as a result of a lower blood glucose response to individual meals.

A lower glycemic diet can be achieved by choosing foods with low or reduced glycemic properties, more specifically by choosing lower GI foods from within each food group (fruit, vegetable, whole grains, etc.). The use of Isomaltulose in place of sucrose and other carbohydrates allows for the production of foods with reduced GI. Several studies provide evidence of improvements in both blood glucose control and lipid metabolism in both diabetic and non-diabetic persons upon regular consumption of isomaltulose when compared with other carbohydrates such as sucrose, maltodextrin, or glucose.

=== Effect on fat oxidation ===
Compared to other carbohydrates, isomaltulose ingestion is associated with higher rates of fat oxidation and lower rates of fat storage. First, isomaltulose "dives" under the enzymatic "radar" surpassing the GIP producing upper part of the small intestine. It finds the degrading enzyme deep down in the GLP part of the intestine. GLP/GIP balance favors late insulin secretion, and shuts down glucagon secretion. Thus the release or new production of liver glucose is slowed down. Mechanistically this involves a lower blood glucose concentration with reduced insulin secretion, which in turn allows more fatty acids to be released from adipose tissue for oxidation as an energy source. The lower insulin concentration also decreases carbohydrate oxidation, allowing more fatty acids to be oxidized. A lower insulin concentration also lowers the rate of liver free fatty acid recycling via plasma VLDL triglycerides and reduces the storage of triglycerides in adipose tissue. Practical implications include higher rates of fat oxidation after ingestion of isomaltulose than higher glycaemic carbohydrates. This has been shown in many studies with different areas of focus:

==== Weight management and body composition ====
Studies have looked at the effects on fat oxidation and other metabolic responses when replacing sugars with isomaltulose in meals (or drinks) taken by healthy or overweight to obese adults, with or without impaired glucose tolerance, while largely sedentary. These studies have shown isomaltulose to have a role in reducing adiposity, at least central obesity. Abdominal fat decreases when consuming isomaltulose instead of sucrose (sugar replacement) or instead of breakfast calories (largely carbohydrate replacement). This is brought about at least in part by a lower GIP and higher GLP-1 response when carbohydrate is slow to digest and is absorbed slowly in the lower (distal) small intestine.

==== Physical activity and sports nutrition ====
Others studies have examined the potential benefits of slow and sustained release of carbohydrate during physical activity. Using isomaltulose in place of other ingested carbohydrates, higher rates of fat oxidation also occur during endurance activities, where preserving glycogen is important. In addition, trials using a recovery protein drink have shown that incorporating isomaltulose and a nutritional supplement (β-hydroxy- β-methylbutyrate ) may help recovery from resistance exercise—so reducing of muscle damage and improving athletic performance.

==== Type 1 diabetes patients engaging in physical activity ====
In people with type 1 diabetes, taking isomaltulose instead of glucose during moderate carbohydrate loading before exercise improves blood glucose control and protects against hypoglycemia while maintaining running performance. The reduced risk of exercise-induced hypoglycemia arises in part from a lower requirement for insulin by injection (50% lower) when using isomaltulose and in part from the higher contribution of fat oxidation to energy metabolism, which preserves glycogen stores, further reducing the risk of hypoglycemia.

=== Cognitive performance (mood and memory) ===
The rate of glucose supply from dietary carbohydrates can affect cognitive performance, with effects on mood and memory having been shown in several studies that compared isomaltulose with higher glycaemic carbohydrates taken at breakfast, showing improvements in mood and memory in healthy children, middle-aged adults, and aged adults.

=== Oral health ===
Isomaltulose is ‘kind to teeth’. Fermentation of carbohydrates by bacteria in the mouth (especially on the teeth) is responsible for the formation of dental plaque and oral acids. The acid initiates tooth demineralisation and tooth decay (dental caries). Isomaltulose largely resists fermentation by oral bacteria and is the first carbohydrate of its kind with negligible acid production on teeth, as shown by pH telemetry. The evidence is strong and provides the basis for ‘kind to teeth’ claims approved by both the Food and Drug Administration in the USA and European authorities following a positive opinion from the European Food Safety Authority.

== Production and assays ==
The enzyme isomaltulose synthase from the bacterium Protaminobacter rubrum is used to turn sucrose into isomaltulose. The enzyme and its source were discovered by the German company Südzucker in 1950.

Analytical methods for characterization and assay of commercial isomaltulose are laid down, for example, in the Food Chemicals Codex.

== Use ==
Isomaltulose is used in foods, drinks and health products owing to several of its properties. It is used in foods and beverages, where it provides a natural sucrose-like sweetness profile with a sweetening power about half that of sucrose, and no aftertaste. It has very low moisture absorption (hygroscopy), giving it free-flowing properties in instant powders, which because of their low risk of lumping can easily be used in drinks and other instant products. It is highly stable during processing, including acidic conditions and environments where bacteria might grow. In sports beverages, for instance, isotonicity (osmotic pressure equal to that of fluids in the body) can be maintained during storage over the beverage's shelf-life.

Isomaltulose finds application in baked goods, pastry glazings and icings, breakfast cereals, cereal bars, dairy produce, sugar confectionery (e.g. chocolates, jellies, chewy confections and chewing or bubble gum), frozen desserts, fruit-juice beverages, malt beverages, sports beverages, energy drinks, instant drinks, and special and clinical nutrition feeds.

Isomaltulose is permitted for use in foods and drinks in many regions worldwide. For example, it is generally recognized as safe (GRAS) by the U.S. Food and Drug Administration, is approved as a novel food by the European Commission, and in Japan has the status FOSHU (food for specific health use).

Isomaltulose is hydrogenated to produce isomalt, a minimally digestible carbohydrate that is used as a sugar replacer, for example in sugar-free candies and confectionery.
