= Disaccharide =

Complex sugar

Sucrose, a disaccharide formed from condensation of a molecule of glucose and a molecule of fructose

A disaccharide (also called a double sugar or biose) is a sugar formed when two monosaccharides are joined by glycosidic linkage. It is therefore a dimer, with a polymerization degree of 2, even if the two component sugars are not the same type. Like monosaccharides, disaccharides are simple sugars and generally soluble in water. Common examples include sucrose (glucose–fructose), lactose (galactose–glucose), and maltose (glucose–glucose). In living organisms, disaccharides are widely used for structural and energy storage, and may be further polymerized by glycosyltransferases to create polysaccharides of repeating disaccharide units, such as glycosaminoglycans or amylose.

Disaccharides are one of the four chemical groupings of carbohydrates (monosaccharides, disaccharides, oligosaccharides, and polysaccharides). The most common types of disaccharides—sucrose, lactose, and maltose—have 12 carbon atoms, with the general formula C_{12}H_{22}O_{11}. The differences in these disaccharides are due to atomic arrangements within the molecule and the type of glycosidic linkage.

The joining of monosaccharides into a double sugar happens by a condensation reaction, which involves the elimination of a water molecule from the functional groups only. Breaking apart a double sugar into its two monosaccharides is accomplished by hydrolysis with the help of a type of enzyme called a disaccharidase. As building the larger sugar ejects a water molecule, breaking it down consumes a water molecule. These reactions are vital in metabolism. Each disaccharide is broken down with the help of a corresponding disaccharidase (sucrase, lactase, and maltase).

== Classification ==
There are two functionally different classes of disaccharides:

- Reducing disaccharides, in which one monosaccharide, the reducing sugar of the pair, still has a free hemiacetal unit that can perform as a reducing aldehyde group; lactose, maltose and cellobiose are examples of reducing disaccharides, each with one hemiacetal unit, the other occupied by the glycosidic bond, which prevents it from acting as a reducing agent. They can easily be detected by the Woehlk test or Fearon's test on methylamine.
- Non-reducing disaccharides, in which the component monosaccharides bond through an acetal linkage between their anomeric centers. This results in neither monosaccharide being left with a hemiacetal unit that is free to act as a reducing agent. Sucrose and trehalose are examples of non-reducing disaccharides because their glycosidic bond is between their respective hemiacetal carbon atoms. The reduced chemical reactivity of the non-reducing sugars, in comparison to reducing sugars, may be an advantage where stability in storage is important.

== Formation ==
The formation of a disaccharide molecule from two monosaccharide molecules proceeds by displacing a hydroxy group from one molecule and a hydrogen nucleus (a proton) from the other, so that the new vacant bonds on the monosaccharides join the two monomers together. Because of the removal of the water molecule from the product, the term of convenience for such a process is "dehydration reaction" (also "condensation reaction" or "dehydration synthesis"). For example, milk sugar (lactose) is a disaccharide made by condensation of one molecule of each of the monosaccharides glucose and galactose, whereas the disaccharide sucrose in sugar cane and sugar beet, is a condensation product of glucose and fructose. Maltose, another common disaccharide, is condensed from two glucose molecules.

The dehydration reaction that bonds monosaccharides into disaccharides (and also bonds monosaccharides into more complex polysaccharides) forms what are called glycosidic bonds.

== Characteristic reactions ==
Lactitol is one of several sugar alcohols produced from disaccharides

Disaccharides can serve as functional groups by forming glycosidic bonds with other organic compounds, forming glycosides and glycoconjugates.

Disaccarides characteristically undergo hydrolysis to give monosaccharides.

Some disaccharides can be hydrogenated to give useful disaccharide alcohols with retention of the acetal linkage. Commercial products include lactitol, isomalt, and maltitol. Isomalt production begins with a bacterial promoted conversion of sucrose to isomaltulose.

Sucrose undergoes acid catalyzed poly-dehydration to give hydroxymethylfurfural.

== Assimilation ==
Digestion of disaccharides involves breakdown into monosaccharides.

== Common disaccharides ==
Disaccharide	Unit 1	Unit 2	Bond
Sucrose (table sugar, cane sugar, beet sugar, or saccharose)	Glucose	Fructose	α(1→2)β
Lactose (milk sugar)	Galactose	Glucose	β(1→4)
Maltose (malt sugar)	Glucose	Glucose	α(1→4)
Trehalose	Glucose	Glucose	α(1→1)α
Cellobiose	Glucose	Glucose	β(1→4)
Chitobiose	Glucosamine	Glucosamine	β(1→4)

Maltose, cellobiose, and chitobiose are hydrolysis products of the polysaccharides starch, cellulose, and chitin, respectively.

Less common disaccharides include:

Disaccharide	Units	Bond
Kojibiose	Two glucoses	α(1→2)
Nigerose	Two glucoses	α(1→3)
Isomaltose	Two glucoses	α(1→6)
β,β-Trehalose	Two glucoses	β(1→1)β
α,β-Trehalose	Two glucoses	α(1→1)β
Sophorose	Two glucoses	β(1→2)
Laminaribiose	Two glucoses	β(1→3)
Gentiobiose	Two glucoses	β(1→6)
Trehalulose	One glucose and one fructose	α(1→1)
Turanose	One glucose and one fructose	α(1→3)
Maltulose	One glucose and one fructose	α(1→4)
Leucrose	One glucose and one fructose	α(1→5)
Isomaltulose	One glucose and one fructose	α(1→6)
Gentiobiulose	One glucose and one fructose	β(1→6)
Mannobiose	Two mannoses	Either α(1→2), α(1→3), α(1→4), or α(1→6)
Melibiose	One galactose and one glucose	α(1→6)
Allolactose	One galactose and one glucose	β(1→6)
Melibiulose	One galactose and one fructose	α(1→6)
Lactulose	One galactose and one fructose	β(1→4)
Rutinose	One rhamnose and one glucose	α(1→6)
Rutinulose	One rhamnose and one fructose	β(1→6)
Xylobiose	Two xylopyranoses	β(1→4)
