= Evocative/suppression testing =

- OPS-301 code: 1-797

Evocative/suppression testing refers to a class of tests performed where one substance is measured both before and after the administration of another substance to determine if the levels are stimulated ("evocative") or suppressed.

They are most commonly performed in the evaluation of possible endocrine disorders.

Certain tests are performed in the evaluation of multiple conditions, and not all listed substances may be measured in each test.

Examples include:

Test name	Substance administered	Substance measured	Condition evaluated
combined rapid anterior pituitary evaluation panel	insulin, GnRH, TRH	ACTH and cortisol, FSH, HGH, LH, prolactin, TSH	hypopituitarism
TRH stimulation test	TRH	TSH	secondary hypothyroidism
ACTH stimulation test	ACTH	cortisol, 17α-hydroxyprogesterone	adrenal insufficiency, Congenital adrenal hyperplasia (21-hydroxylase, 3 beta)
metyrapone panel	metyrapone	cortisol, 11-deoxycortisol	adrenal insufficiency
dexamethasone suppression test	dexamethasone	cortisol	Cushing's syndrome
captopril suppression test	captopril	aldosterone	primary aldosteronism
captopril challenge test	captopril	renin	renal artery stenosis
