= Adrenocorticotropic hormone deficiency =

- Other names: ACTH Deficiency, Isolated adrenocorticotropic hormone deficiency, Isolated ACTH Deficiency.
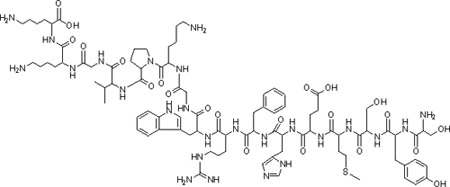
- Adrenocorticotropic hormone (ACTH), structure
- Specialty: Endocrinology
- Symptoms: Fatigue, anorexia, weight loss, hypoglycemia, muscle weakness, nausea, vomiting, and hypotension.
- Complications: Adrenal crisis
- Causes: Autoimmune processes, congenital etiologies, and physical trauma.
- Diagnostic method: Morning serum cortisol levels, Insulin tolerance testing, and ACTH stimulation test
- Differential diagnosis: Congenital adrenal hyperplasia, Addison's disease, and Secondary adrenal insufficiency.
- Treatment: Glucocorticoids.

Adrenocorticotropic hormone deficiency is a rare disorder characterized by secondary adrenal insufficiency with minimal or no cortisol production and normal pituitary hormone secretion apart from ACTH. ACTH deficiency may be congenital or acquired, and its symptoms are clinically similar to those of glucocorticoid deficiency. Symptoms consist of weight loss, diminished appetite, muscle weakness, nausea, vomiting, and hypotension. Low blood sugar and hyponatremia are possible; however, blood potassium levels typically remain normal because affected patients are deficient in glucocorticoids rather than mineralocorticoids because of their intact renin-angiotensin-aldosterone system. ACTH may be undetectable in blood tests, and cortisol is abnormally low. Glucocorticoid replacement therapy is required. With the exception of stressful situations, some patients with mild or nearly asymptomatic disease may not require glucocorticoid replacement therapy. As of 2008 about two hundred cases have been described in the literature.

== Signs and symptoms ==
Adrenocorticotropic hormone deficiency has a variety of clinical manifestations and can be fatal if left untreated. Clinical manifestations of adrenocorticotropic hormone deficiency are similar to those of primary adrenal insufficiency, except for cutaneous hyperpigmentation and electrolyte disturbances.

Adrenocorticotropic hormone deficiency is characterized by nonspecific symptoms such as fatigue, anorexia, unintentional weight loss, and hypoglycemia. Pale skin may contribute to patients' diminished appearance and aid in differentiating between primary and secondary adrenal insufficiency. Secondary adrenal insufficiency is not associated with a lack of aldosterone, so symptoms and signs of mineralocorticoid deficiency, such as salt craving, postural hypotension, and electrolyte abnormalities, are typically absent.

Patients with adrenocorticotropic hormone deficiency typically do well during non-stressful periods until an intervening event triggers an acute adrenal crisis. This life-threatening illness is characterized by extreme fatigue, acute abdominal pain, nausea, vomiting, diarrhea, fever, severe hypotension, and hypoglycemia, and may be irreversible if not treated promptly.

== Causes ==
The most common causes of adrenocorticotropic hormone deficiency appear to be related to the pituitary gland and include autoimmune processes, congenital etiologies, and physical trauma. It can occur on its own or as a component of a pluriglandular auto-immune syndrome. After a head injury, isolated ACTH deficiency has been reported in association with diabetes mellitus and benign intracranial hypertension.

Adrenocorticotropic hormone deficiency can be associated with lymphocytic hypophysitis and selective destruction of corticotrophs. This almost always manifests during pregnancy or after childbirth. Patients with lymphocytic hypophysitis or a deficiency in Adrenocorticotropic hormone have been found to have antibodies against a 22 kDalton pituitary protein, which lends support to this theory.

Post-traumatic ACTH deficiency is usually associated with other pituitary defects; however, persistent or transient post-traumatic Adrenocorticotropic hormone deficiency has been reported. Adrenocorticotropic hormone deficiency can also be part of an atypical Sheehan's syndrome, be linked to an empty sella, and appear after brain tumor radiation therapy.

A few instances of acquired adrenocorticotropic hormone deficiency have been linked to autoimmune diseases, such as autoimmune thyroid disease, anti-pituitary antibodies in the serum, such as anti-corticotroph antibodies, and hypophysitis caused by anti-programmed death 1 or anti-programmed death ligand 1 antibodies. This strongly suggests that the development of acquired adrenocorticotropic hormone deficiency is influenced by autoimmune etiology.

=== Genetics ===
It is thought that congenital adrenocorticotropic hormone deficiency is extremely rare. A few cases with onsets ranging from the perinatal period to the early teen years have been described.

TBX19 is involved in corticotropic cell differentiation and proliferation, and TBX19 mutations account for over 60 percent of neonatal cases of adrenocorticotropic hormone deficiency.

The TBX19 gene, formerly known as TPIT, encodes a T-box transcription factor found in pituitary cells that express proopiomelanocortin. TBX19 is required for these cells' terminal differentiation and the expression of the POMC gene. TBX19 is found on chromosome 1q24.2, and its primary transcript consists of 8 exons.

Due to the dual role of α-MSH in regulating food intake and hair pigmentation, a defect in proopiomelanocortin (POMC) or its cleavage enzyme, prohormone convertase, results in defects in POMC-derived peptides (e.g., ACTH, MSH) and consequently, Adrenocorticotropic hormone deficiency. Furthermore, the phenotype associated with a defect in POMC should include obesity, altered hair pigmentation, and ACTH deficiency. Other candidate genes include CRH and CRH receptor type 1, but no mutations in these genes have been linked to a lack of adrenocorticotropic hormone.

== Diagnosis ==
Morning serum cortisol levels are typically the first step in the diagnostic work-up, but this test is only significant if values are extremely low, adrenal insufficiency is almost certain with values below 3 μg/dl, or it can be excluded with values in the upper half of the normal range. Cortisol levels above 19 g/dl almost always rule out adrenal insufficiency. Intermediate values necessitate additional testing.

Insulin tolerance testing is widely regarded as the gold standard for assessing the entire hypothalamic-pituitary-adrenal axis.

A high-dose ACTH stimulation test directly evaluates the adrenal secretory reserve, which can be compromised not only in primary adrenal insufficiency but also in long-term ACTH deficiency. This test may not detect recent onset or less severe forms of secondary adrenal insufficiency, and a normal cortisol response does not rule out secondary adrenal insufficiency, so insulin tolerance testing may be required to confirm the diagnosis.

A low-dose ACTH stimulation test has been suggested as a sensitive test for secondary adrenal insufficiency diagnosis. When compared to insulin tolerance testing and the high-dose ACTH test, this test allows for a more accurate identification of patients with secondary adrenal insufficiency.

Blood chemistry tests may reveal mild hypoglycemia, hyponatremia, normal-to-high potassium levels, slight anemia, lymphocytosis, and eosinophilia. Hypercalcemia can occur in rare cases resulting from increased intestinal absorption as well as decreased renal excretion of calcium caused by glucocorticoid deficiency. TSH is usually mildly elevated since cortisol has no physiological inhibitory effect on TSH.

=== Differential diagnosis ===
Differential diagnosis of Adrenocorticotropic hormone deficiency includes Congenital adrenal hyperplasia, Addison's disease, and Secondary adrenal insufficiency.

Plasma ACTH levels when off glucocorticoid replacement therapy are the best parameter for differential diagnosis, as levels in primary adrenal insufficiency are generally above 100 pg/ml and low-normal in secondary adrenal insufficiency.

== Treatment ==
Replacement doses of glucocorticoids are required for treatment. Except for stressful events, some patients with mild, near-asymptomatic disease may not require glucocorticoid replacement therapy. Mineralocorticoids are generally not required to be administered because their production is maintained.

Glucocorticoid replacement dose must be increased when supervising stressful events such as illnesses, trauma, fever, and major surgical or diagnostic procedures. Vomiting, diarrhea, or other causes of poor intestinal absorption necessitate the administration of intravenous hydrocortisone.

Acute adrenal crisis requires intravenous administration of 100 mg hydrocortisone immediately, followed by 100–200 mg over the next 24 hours and large volumes of saline while under continuous cardiac monitoring.

== Special populations ==
In the neonatal period, adrenocorticotropic hormone deficiency is a potentially fatal condition.TBX19 is involved in the differentiation and proliferation of corticotropic cells, and TBX19 mutations account for 65% of neonatal onset adrenocorticotropic hormone deficiency, which can result in 25% neonatal mortality if not treated.

Low cortisol causes hypoglycemia, prolonged cholestatic jaundice, and seizures in the neonatal period, families frequently have a history of neonatal death.

Cognitive impairment is one of the most serious outcomes of undiagnosed adrenal crises and inadequately adjusted hydrocortisone treatment in adrenocorticotropic hormone deficiency caused by TBX19 mutations. To avoid brain damage, early diagnosis, close clinical monitoring in specialized centers, and multiple therapeutic education sessions for parents are critical.

== See also ==
- Adrenal insufficiency
- Addison's disease
- Adrenal crisis
