= C136H210N40O31S =

The molecular formula C_{136}H_{210}N_{40}O_{31}S (molar mass: 2933.43 g/mol, exact mass: 2931.581 u) may refer to:

- Cosyntropin
- Tetracosactide
