= C22H38O5 =

The molecular formula C_{22}H_{38}O_{5} (molar mass: 382.53 g/mol, exact mass: 382.2719 u) may refer to:

- Misoprostol
- Unoprostone
