= TBX19 =

Protein-coding gene in humans

Identifiers
- Aliases: TBX19, TBS19, TPIT, dJ747L4.1, T-box 19, T-box transcription factor 19
- External IDs: OMIM: 604614; MGI: 1891158; GeneCards: TBX19

Gene location (Human)
Chr.	Chromosome 1 (human)
Band	1q24.2	Start	168,280,877 bp
Band	1q24.2	End	168,314,426 bp

Gene location (Mouse)
Chr.	Chromosome 1 (mouse)
Band	1 H2.2|1 72.47 cM	Start	164,965,424 bp
Band	1 H2.2|1 72.47 cM	End	164,988,342 bp
RNA expression pattern
Bgee	Human / Mouse (ortholog); Top expressed in: anterior pituitary; body of uterus; testicle; ascending aorta; granulocyte; Descending thoracic aorta; right ovary; left ovary; right lung; tibial arteries / Top expressed in: zygote; secondary oocyte; urethra; pituitary gland; female urethra; male urethra; gastrula; lumbar subsegment of spinal cord; primary oocyte; embryo; More reference expression data
BioGPS	n/a
Gene ontology
Molecular function	cis-regulatory region sequence-specific DNA binding; DNA-binding transcription factor activity; DNA binding; RNA polymerase II cis-regulatory region sequence-specific DNA binding; DNA-binding transcription activator activity, RNA polymerase II-specific; DNA-binding transcription factor activity, RNA polymerase II-specific
Cellular component	nucleus
Biological process	transcription, DNA-templated; regulation of transcription by RNA polymerase II; anatomical structure morphogenesis; pituitary gland development; regulation of cell population proliferation; cell fate commitment; regulation of cell differentiation; positive regulation of transcription by RNA polymerase II; regulation of transcription, DNA-templated; transcription by RNA polymerase II
Sources:Amigo / QuickGO
Orthologs
Databases	NCBI: entry; OMA: entry
Species	Human	Mouse
Entrez	9095	83993
Ensembl	ENSG00000143178	ENSMUSG00000026572
UniProt	O60806	Q99ME7
RefSeq (mRNA)	NM_005149	NM_032005
RefSeq (protein)	NP_005140	NP_114394
Location (UCSC)	Chr 1: 168.28 – 168.31 Mb	Chr 1: 164.97 – 164.99 Mb
PubMed search
- Wikidata
View/Edit Human	View/Edit Mouse

T-box transcription factor TBX19 is a protein that in humans is encoded by the TBX19 gene.

This gene is a member of a phylogenetically conserved family of genes that share a common DNA-binding domain, the T-box. T-box genes encode transcription factors involved in the regulation of developmental processes. This gene is the human ortholog of mouse Tbx19/Tpit gene. Studies in mouse show that Tpit protein is present only in the two pituitary pro-opiomelanocortin (POMC)-expressing lineages, the corticotrophs and melanotrophs.

The Tpit gene is responsible for a neonatal form of acth deficiency and hypocortisolism.

Mutations in the human ortholog were found in patients with isolated deficiency of pituitary POMC-derived ACTH, suggesting an essential role for this gene in differentiation of the pituitary POMC lineage.

== See also ==
- Adrenocorticotropic hormone deficiency
