= Mallinckrodt =

American-Irish domiciled pharmaceutical

Mallinckrodt Pharmaceuticals plc
- Type: Public
- Traded as: OTCID Basic: MNKTQ; NYSE: MNK
- ISIN: IE00BBGT3753
- Industry: Pharmaceutical
- Founded: 1867; 159 years ago
- Headquarters: Dublin, Ireland (legal); Staines-upon-Thames, Surrey, UK (executive); Hazelwood, Missouri, US (operational)
- Key people: Paul Bisaro (chairman); Siggi Olafsson (CEO); Bryan Reasons (CFO)
- Revenue: ▲US$1.98 billion (2024)
- Operating income: ▲US$90.2 million (2024)
- Net income: ▲US$478 million (2024)
- Total assets: ▼US$3.30 billion (2024)
- Total equity: ▲US$1.65 billion (2024)
- Number of employees: 2,700 (2024)
- Website: mallinckrodt.com

Mallinckrodt Pharmaceuticals plc is an Irish-American manufacturer of specialty pharmaceuticals (namely, adrenocorticotropic hormone), generic drugs and imaging agents. In 2017, it had 5,500 employees and sales of $3.2 billion, of which $2.9 billion was from the U.S. healthcare system.

On August 1, 2025, it was announced that the firm had merged its operations with those of Endo.

== Overview ==
While Mallinckrodt is headquartered in Ireland for tax purposes, its operational headquarters are in the United States. Mallinckrodt's 2013 tax inversion to Ireland drew controversy when it was shown Acthar was Medicaid's most expensive drug.

It acquires (for repricing), manufactures, and distributes products used in diagnostic procedures and in the treatment of pain and related conditions. This includes the acquisition, manufacture, and distribution of specialty pharmaceuticals, active pharmaceutical ingredients, contrast products, and radiopharmaceuticals.

The company has been implicated as a major contributor to the prescription opioid scandal around the over-prescription of oxycodone in the United States.

== History ==
=== Origins ===
In 1867, the three Mallinckrodt brothers, Gustav, Otto and Edward Sr., founded G. Mallinckrodt & Co. in St. Louis. The Mallinckrodt family had immigrated from Germany. Otto and Edward both temporarily returned to Germany, then the leader in chemical research and education, for advanced training. Brothers Gustav and Otto died in the 1870s, leaving Edward (1845–1928) in sole charge of the family business. Mallinckrodt Chemical Works was incorporated 15 years later, in 1882.

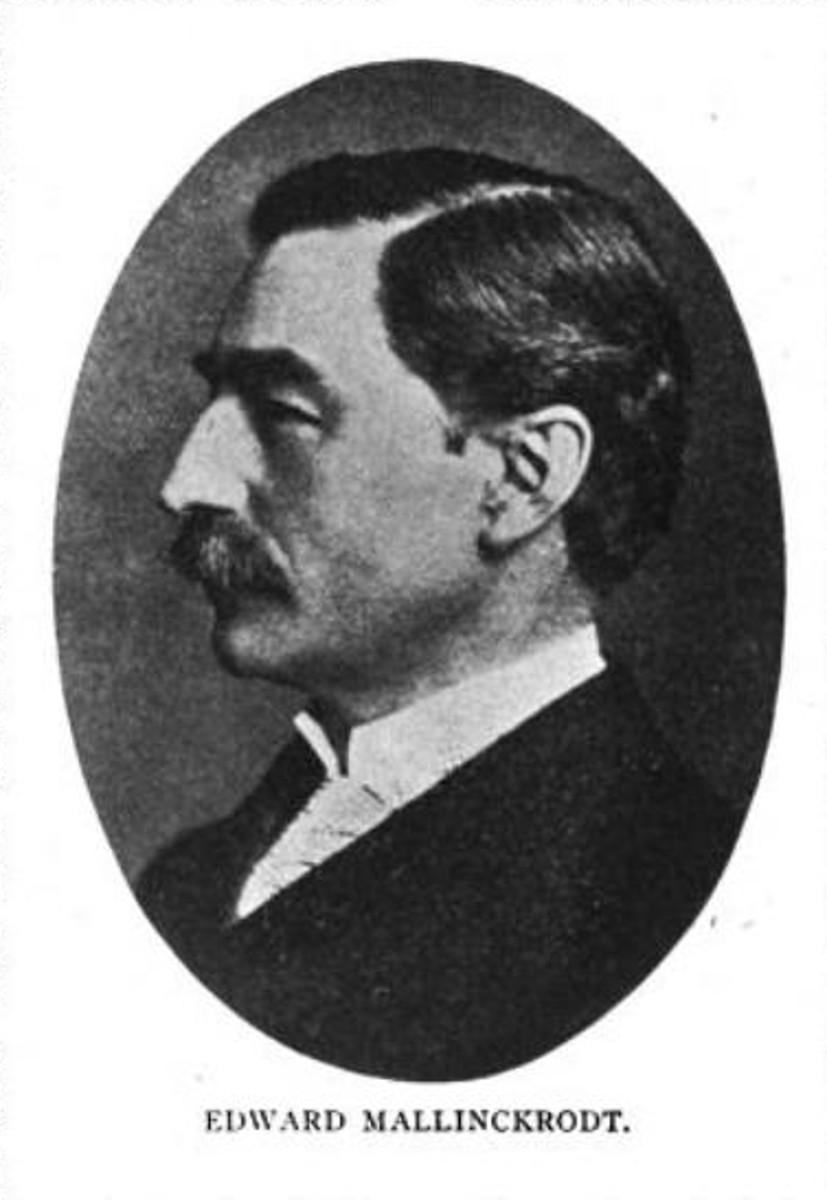
Edward Mallinckrodt, c. 1908

By 1898, the company had established itself as a pharmaceuticals supplier and in 1913 became the first to introduce barium sulfate as a contrast medium for X-rays. In part due to early success in production of radiology agents, and at the behest of surgeon Evarts Graham, Edward Mallinckrodt Sr. assigned one of the company's top chemists to collaborate in developing the first radiographic agent for gallbladder and bile duct imaging.

=== Uranium processing (1942–1957) ===
In April 1942 Edward Mallinckrodt was approached by a contingent from the Metallurgical Laboratory of the Manhattan Project, particularly by Arthur Holly Compton. Compton urgently needed a source of refined uranium. The chemical company already worked with ether, which could theoretically be used in a purifying process but which posed its own handling risks. With extreme haste and with tight security restrictions, Mallinckrodt developed a novel technique from theoretical concept, to experiment, to full production. The company submitted test materials by mid-May, supplied the material for the first self-sustaining reaction in December, and had satisfied the project's entire order of the first sixty tons before the contract with the government was even signed.

From 1942 to 1957, Mallinckrodt processed uranium ore for the Manhattan Project feed materials program at a factory north of downtown St. Louis. Nuclear waste from the factory and other locations was buried in steel drums at a 21.7-acre site near Lambert Field. Radioactive waste from the site seeped into Coldwater Creek. The area was designated a Superfund site by the Environmental Protection Agency in 1989.

=== Corporate changes ===
The company issued public shares in 1954. Viewed as an attractive takeover target in the era of leveraged buyouts, Mallinckrodt was bought by Avon Products in 1982, and largely kept intact as a business entity. Just four years later it was sold to International Minerals and Chemical Corporation. After re-brandings, spin-offs and other changes of corporate identity Mallinckrodt was again sold in 2000 to Tyco International.

=== Cocaine processing from Coca-Cola's coca plants ===
Coca-Cola includes a coca leaf extract as an ingredient prepared by Stepan Company in Maywood, New Jersey. The plant is the only commercial entity in the United States authorized by the Drug Enforcement Administration to import coca leaves, which come primarily from Peru via the National Coca Company. The plant extracts the cocaine from the coca plants and sells it to Mallinckrodt for medicinal purposes.

As of 1988, Mallinckrodt is the only company in the U.S. that is allowed to receive cocaine, which is sold as a prescription drug for use in hospitals as a local anesthetic by eye and ear, nose and throat (ENT) doctors.

=== Ties to Washington University in St. Louis ===
Throughout its history, Washington University in St. Louis has received a large number of donations from the Mallinckrodt family and corporation, including a posthumous endowment by Edward Mallinckrodt Jr. on behalf of his father to the Washington University School of Medicine Radiology Department resulting in the creation of the Mallinckrodt Institute of Radiology. Both Edward Mallinckrodt Sr. and Jr. served as members of the Washington University Board of Trustees. Washington University in St. Louis' student union building and performing arts building was renamed the Mallinckrodt Center in 1976.

In 2018, Mallinckrodt partnered with the Washington University School of Medicine with funding of up to $10 million over five years to support research projects that show promise in developing new drugs for treating rare diseases.

The elder Edward also made significant donations to his alma mater, Harvard University, and to the St. Louis College of Pharmacy.

=== Tax inversion to Ireland (2013) ===
In 2013, Mallinckrodt executed a corporate tax inversion to Ireland to avoid U.S. corporate taxes, by acquiring Irish-based Cadence Pharma for $1.3 billion. This was despite the fact that almost all of Mallinckrodt's revenues come from the U.S. market (see table below). In 2015, Mallinckrodt was one of several U.S. tax inversions that The Wall Street Journal reported to be using a lower tax-platform to acquire further U.S. pharmaceutical firms, such as the $5.6 billion acquisition of Questor in 2014. In December 2015, The Irish Times reported the CEO as saying that "It'd have to be a pretty dramatic change to the US tax code" for Mallinckrodt to return to the U.S., and that "We're already foreign domiciled, so we may as well take full advantage of it".

In February 2018, Mallinckrodt told the Wall Street Journal that it would get a $450 to $500 million tax credits from the Tax Cuts and Jobs Act of 2017 (TCJA), but that some of these benefits would be offset by the anti-inversion provisions of the TCJA. In April 2018, Mallinckrodt's Irish tax inversion came under further scrutiny when it was revealed that Mallinckrodt's main drug, Acthar, was one of the most expensive drug-related expenditures for the U.S. Medicare programme.

Mallinckrodt net sales by region (SEC 10-K filing, 2017)
Region	Sales ($ m)	Distribution (%)
U.S.	2,899.0	90.3
Europe, Middle East and Africa	242.3	7.5
Other	80.3	2.2
Total	3,211.6	100.0

=== Acthar controversy ===
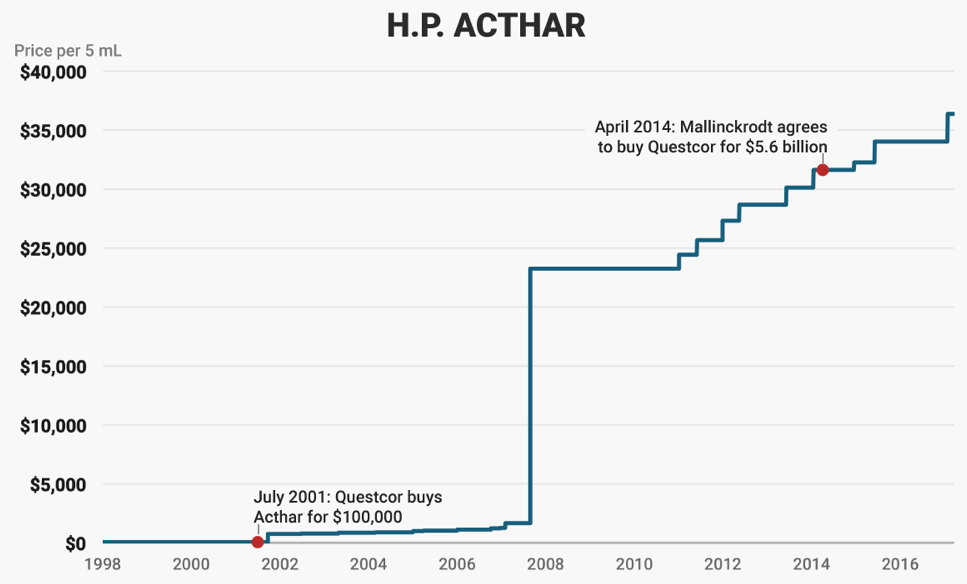
Price of Mallinckrodt's H.P Acthar drug dating back to Questor's acquisition of Acthar from Sanofi Aventis in July 2001 for $100,000

In December 2012, The New York Times, in an article on Mallinckrodt's main drug H.P. Acthar Gel, (Note: H.P. Acthar Gel represents a little over one-third of Mallinckrodt's sales; however, its strong profitability means that it is considered to be responsible for the bulk of Mallinckrodt's profits.) reported: "How the price of this drug rose so far, so fast is a story for these troubled times in American health care—a tale of aggressive marketing, questionable medicine and, not least, out-of-control costs". In January 2017, the Financial Times reported that Mallinckrodt had made a settlement of $100 million with the U.S. Federal Trade Commission (FTC) in relation to antitrust probes on Acthar and quoted the FTC as saying: "Questcor [Mallinckrodt's subsidiary] took advantage of its monopoly to repeatedly raise the price of Acthar, from $40 per vial in 2001 to more than $34,000 per vial today – an 85,000 percent increase". The city of Rockford, Illinois, is now suing Mallinckrodt and pharmacy benefit management company Express Scripts for their failure to reduce Acthar's price.

In May 2017, the Wall Street Journal reported that U.S. investor Jim Chanos accused Mallinckrodt in relation to Acthar of being a "one-product company", and the Irish Times quoted Chanos on Bloomberg stating that a "murky alliance" had developed between Mallinckrodt and distributor Express Scripts, who is the sole distributor of Acthar, and that "Acthar is the epitome of excessive drug prices". In September 2017, the Journal of the American Medical Association (JAMA) published research showing that Acthar was one of the most expensive drugs in the U.S. Medicaid and Medicare system, but that most sales of Acthar were "driven in part by a relatively small group of doctors who were prescribing it heavily", and that alternatives at one-fiftieth of the price of Acthar were available.

In April 2018, a whistleblower lawsuit claimed Acthar, which had never passed a modern FDA process as Acthar had been available for 60 years and was thus passed under FDA "grandfathering" rules, had an unknown formulation and efficacy. (Note: Acthar is a hormone-based drug derived from pig pituitary glands that had been on the market for more than 60 years.) The lawsuit claimed that this situation would not be sustainable without the support of Express Scripts.

A whistleblower filed a qui tam action in 2018 alleging that Mallinckrodt failed to pay the correct Medicaid rebates for Acthar in violation of the federal and state False Claims Acts. Medicaid Rules required Mallinckrodt to pay back the amount it had raised the price of Achtar above inflation. To avoid meeting its increased rebate obligations, Mallinckrodt began reporting Acthar’s base AMP as if it had been approved in 2010 (after the enormous price increases).

In October 2020, Mallinckrodt filed for bankruptcy, which stayed the pending False Claims Act case. On March 2, 2022, the bankruptcy court confirmed Mallinckrodt’s plan of reorganization, which included the settlement of the whistleblower's lawsuit for $234 million.

=== Role in opioid crisis ===
A US Drug Enforcement Administration (DEA) database tracking every opioid pill sold in the United States from 2006 through 2012 was made public in 2019. The database "attributed the vast majority of the 76 billion opioid pills produced and shipped from 2006 through 2012 to three companies", one of which was SpecGx, a subsidiary of Mallinckrodt. In those years SpecGx supplied 28.9 billion oxycodone pills, more than 80 for each person in the United States, and over 2 billion pills just in Florida.

In 2011 the DEA complained to Mallinckrodt about the problem of excessive prescription opioid shipments to pharmacies. DEA officials showed the company the hundreds of millions of doses of oxycodone it was shipping to distributors and the correspondingly high number of arrests being made for oxycodone possession and sale in those areas. Negotiations between the DEA and Mallinckrodt ensued, and in 2017 Mallinckrodt paid a $35 million fine to settle DEA complaints it did not adequately address suspicious opioid orders, acknowledging "certain aspects of Mallinckrodt's system to monitor and detect suspicious orders did not meet" DEA standards.

Mallinckrodt announced in April 2019 a plan to change its name to Sonorant Therapeutics, and spin off "Mallinckrodt Inc." as a separate company for its generics business. Legal liabilities that result from opioid litigation would "remain with Mallinckrodt Inc. or its subsidiaries following the separation."

In February 2020, the company struck a $1.6 billion deal with Florida and dozens of other states to settle lawsuits over its role in the US opioid crisis.

In October 2020, Mallinckrodt filed for Chapter 11 bankruptcy protection while facing more than $1 billion in costs from lawsuits over its role in fueling the opioid crisis.

On June 2, 2023, Mallinckrodt announced that they would be considering a second Chapter 11 bankruptcy protection filing after lenders of the company raised concerns over an upcoming $200 million payment related to opioid-related litigation that was due in the coming weeks. However, on June 16, Mallinckrodt got an extension on their $200 million payment with a new due date of June 23, 2023. On June 23, the day the payment was supposed to be due, Mallinckrodt got their payment due date extended for the second time to June 30, 2023. It later got delayed to July 7, 2023, and again to July 14, 2023.

On July 11, 2023, Mallinckrodt was sued for allegedly misleading investors for misrepresenting its financial strength before missing payments to opioid victims and bond holders. On July 14, Mallinckrodt's $200 million opioid payment was once again extended to July 21. On July 17, it was extended yet again to August 15.

On July 27, 2023, Mallinckrodt announced that they were in negotiations to completely avoid paying the opioid payment to victims. If this plan turns out successful, victims of the opioid payment could lose up to a maximum of $1 billion, and the money could end up going to funds and investors instead. On August 15, 2023, Mallinckrodt announced that they were preparing to file for their second Chapter 11 bankruptcy filing in three years after failing to make scheduled payments to its lenders and opioid creditors since June, citing numerous short-term extensions to its payment within the last two months. Mallinckrodt is currently in negotiations to establish a restructuring support agreement with its stakeholders, and the payment was also extended once again to next week. Mallinckrodt stated that there would be no guaranteed recovery for holders of its ordinary equity shares in the eventuality of a bankruptcy filing .

On August 23, after losing approximately 92% of their stock value in 2023, Mallinckrodt officially announced their intention to file for Chapter 11 protection within the coming days in order to reduce the amount of long-term debt it owes to victims of the opioid crisis and cut its debt obligations. The company has also entered into a new restructuring agreement with its creditors and an opioid victims trust. On August 28, 2023, Mallinckrodt and some of its affiliated debtors filed a voluntary petition under Chapter 11 of the United States Code in the United States District Court for the District of Delaware for the second time in three years in effort to dramatically cut its debt load and reduce its sweeping opioid settlement. Immediately after the announcement, the NYSE halted Mallinckrodt's stock, and its stock was delisted from the New York Stock Exchange soon thereafter, and began trading on OTC Markets.

On November 14, 2023, Mallinckrodt reduced its total funded debt by approximately $1.9 billion after winning approval for its bankruptcy plan to ample liquidity to execute strategic priorities back in October, and announced that it has completed its second Chapter 11 reorganization and has exited bankruptcy. Ownership of Mallinckrodt will be handed over to lenders and bondholders and all remaining equity sales would end.

=== Merger ===
In March 2025, Mallinckrodt and Endo announced plans to merge in a deal valued at $6.7 billion.

== Major acquisitions ==
- 1981 – Mallinckrodt was listed among Fortune 500 companies
- 1982 – Avon Products, Inc. acquired Mallinckrodt
- 1986 – International Minerals and Chemical Corporation (IMCERA Group Inc.) acquired Mallinckrodt from Avon Products
- 1992 – Malinckrodt owned HemoCue
- 1995 – Mallinckrodt established generic pharmaceuticals business
- 1996 – Mallinckrodt acquired maker of urology imaging systems and injectors, Liebel-Flarsheim Co.
- 2000 – Tyco International acquired Mallinckrodt
- 2007 – Tyco Healthcare spun off as Covidien, an independent company. The healthcare business units were spun off under the name Covidien.
- 2011 – Covidien announced plans to spin off Mallinckrodt Pharmaceuticals, and Mallinckrodt Plc was separated on June 28, 2013, trading on the ticker MNK from July 1, 2013.
- 2012 – Mallinckrodt announced acquisition of CNS Therapeutics for $100 million
- 2013 – Mallinckrodt spun off from Covidien and began trading under ticker symbol MNK
- 2013 – Mallinckrodt acquired Cadence Pharmaceuticals for £1.3 billion in an Irish corporate tax inversion to escape U.S. taxes.
- 2014 – Mallinckrodt acquired Questcor Pharmaceuticals for $5.6 billion (owner of Acthar); Mallinckrodt joins the S&P 500
- 2015 – Mallinckrodt acquired Ikaria Inc. for $2.3 billion
- 2015 – Mallinckrodt acquired Therakos for $1.325 billion (later sold to CVC Capital Partners for $925 million in 2024.)
- 2015 – Mallinckrodt sold the Contrast Media and Deliver Systems portion of its portfolio to Guerbet for $270M cash with a loan financed by BNP Paribas
- 2016 – Mallinckrodt acquired regenerative medicine company Stratatech
- 2017 – In September, Mallinckrodt acquired specialty pharmaceutical company, InfaCare Pharmaceutical Corporation. In November the company announced its intention to acquire Ocera Therapeutics for up to $117 million.
- 2018 – In February 2018, Mallinckrodt acquired Sucampo Pharmaceuticals.

In December 2018 the company announced it will spin off its specialty generics business into a separate publicly traded company, initially owned by existing Mallinckrodt shareholders. The division generated $840 million in 2017 and the deal will also include constipation drug, Amitiza. Chief Financial Officer, Matthew Harbaugh, will head the new company which will retain the Mallinckrodt name. The remaining business of specialty branded products will be renamed and led by current Chief Executive Officer, Mark Trudeau. Legal liabilities that result from opioid litigation are expected to be the responsibility of Mallinckrodt Inc. or its subsidiaries following the separation.

== Products ==
Mallinckrodt has two main product lines.

- Specialty Pharmaceuticals products include branded drugs as well as specialty generics and active pharmaceutical ingredients (APIs). Products include biologics, medicinal opioids, synthetic controlled substances, and acetaminophen.
- Medical Imaging products include contrast media and radiopharmaceuticals for medical imaging applications.

In the fourth quarter of 2014, Specialty Pharmaceuticals accounted for 74% of net sales. Key specialty pharmaceutical products include:

- Acthar gel, an injectable biopharmaceutical used for the treatment of infantile spasms, acute exacerbations of multiple sclerosis, and certain orphan diseases. Mallinckrodt acquired this product via its acquisition of Questcor Pharmaceuticals in 2014. When Questcor acquired the drug in 2001 it sold for $40 a vial; within a year of the acquisition Questcor raised the price of the drug to $1,500 per vial and to $28,000 by 2013. In 2013, Questcor acquired the US rights to a competing product, Synacthen Depot, from Novartis. In 2014 Mallinckrodt raised the price of Acthar further to $34,000. The Federal Trade Commission and attorneys general from five states sued Mallinckrodt for anti-competitive behavior with regard to the acquisition of Synacthen Depot and the monopolistic pricing of Acthar, and in January 2017 the company settled, agreeing to pay $100 million and to license Synacthen Depot to a competitor.
- Ofirmev is a proprietary IV formulation of acetaminophen used in conjunction with opioid painkillers in the post surgical setting.
- Xartemis XR is a controlled release oral combination of acetaminophen and oxycodone for the treatment of acute pain.
- Exalgo is a once-daily, long-acting form of hydromorphone, another pain drug.

Mallinckrodt specializes in producing generic controlled substances and compounds. Their products include:

- Buprenorphine/naloxone – brand name Suboxone™
- Codeine
- Dextroamphetamine – one of four constituent amphetamine salts which together form the brand name drug Adderall
- Fentanyl citrate
- Hydrocodone API and tablets
- Hydromorphone (common brand name: Dilaudid)
- Methadone solid in two forms – a liquid-suspension oral concentrate, Mallinckrodt brand name Methadose™, and as generic 40mg Methadone HCl tablets
- Methylphenidate hydrochloride (common brand names Ritalin, Concerta)
- Naloxone Hydrochloride – common brand name Narcan
- Naltrexone – common brand names Revia, Vivitrol
- Oxycodone – as API and tablets common brand name OxyContin
- Pethidine – a.k.a. meperidine; common brand name: Demerol
- Sufentanil citrate
- Other compounded medications which combine some of the aforementioned drugs with acetaminophen/paracetamol or ibuprofen, such as hydrocodone/paracetamol (a.k.a. Vicodin).

Medical imaging products include Optiray (ioversol injection), an iodide based contrast medium for CT scans, and Optimark (gadoversetamide injection) a Gadolinium-Based Contrast Agent used in magnetic resonance imaging (MRI) of the brain or liver.

== See also ==
- Corporate tax inversions
- Ireland as a tax haven
