= Alsactide =

Chemical compound

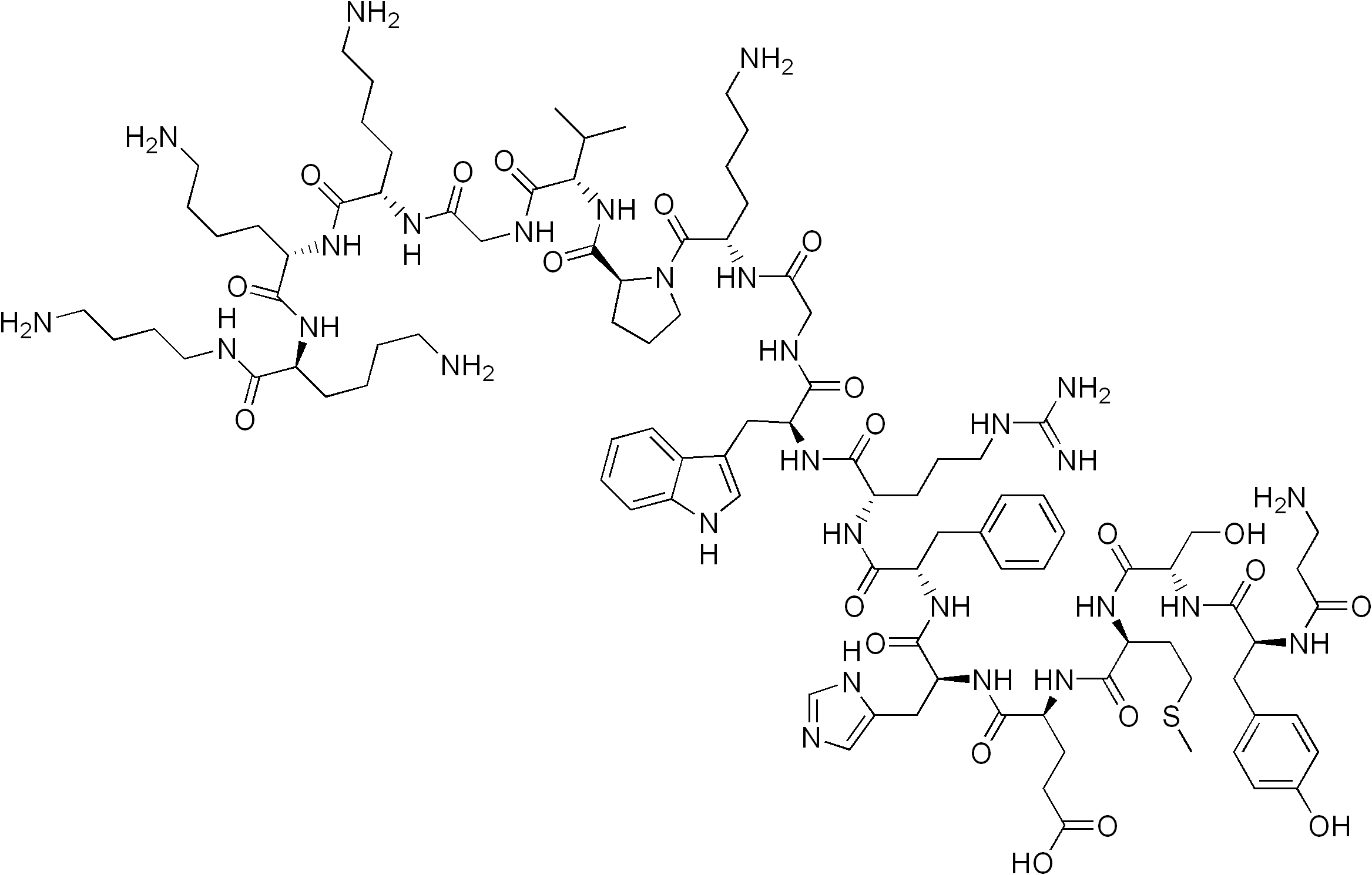

Clinical data
- ATC code: V04CH04 (WHO)

Identifiers
- CAS Number: 34765-96-3
- PubChem CID: 16129705
- ChemSpider: 17286506
- UNII: J0K70H3420
- KEGG: D07417
- CompTox Dashboard (EPA): DTXSID90188321
- ECHA InfoCard: 100.047.442

Chemical and physical data
- Formula: C_{99}H_{155}N_{29}O_{21}S
- Molar mass: 2119.57 g·mol^{−1}
- 3D model (JSmol): Interactive image
- SMILES: [H]/N=C(\N)/NCCC[C@@H](C(=O)N[C@@H](Cc1c[nH]c2c1cccc2)C(=O)NCC(=O)N[C@@H](CCCCN)C(=O)N3CCC[C@H]3C(=O)N[C@@H](C(C)C)C(=O)NCC(=O)N[C@@H](CCCCN)C(=O)N[C@@H](CCCCN)C(=O)N[C@@H](CCCCN)C(=O)NCCCCN)NC(=O)[C@H](Cc4ccccc4)NC(=O)[C@H](Cc5cnc[nH]5)NC(=O)[C@H](CCC(=O)O)NC(=O)[C@H](CCSC)NC(=O)[C@H](CO)NC(=O)[C@H](Cc6ccc(cc6)O)NC(=O)CCN
- InChI: InChI=1S/C99H155N29O21S/c1-59(2)84(97(148)113-56-81(132)115-68(26-10-14-40-101)87(138)119-69(27-11-15-41-102)88(139)118-67(25-9-13-39-100)85(136)109-45-18-17-43-104)127-96(147)79-30-20-47-128(79)98(149)73(28-12-16-42-103)116-82(133)55-112-86(137)76(51-62-53-111-66-24-8-7-23-65(62)66)124-89(140)70(29-19-46-110-99(106)107)120-93(144)75(49-60-21-5-4-6-22-60)123-94(145)77(52-63-54-108-58-114-63)125-90(141)71(35-36-83(134)135)121-91(142)72(38-48-150-3)122-95(146)78(57-129)126-92(143)74(117-80(131)37-44-105)50-61-31-33-64(130)34-32-61/h4-8,21-24,31-34,53-54,58-59,67-79,84,111,129-130H,9-20,25-30,35-52,55-57,100-105H2,1-3H3,(H,108,114)(H,109,136)(H,112,137)(H,113,148)(H,115,132)(H,116,133)(H,117,131)(H,118,139)(H,119,138)(H,120,144)(H,121,142)(H,122,146)(H,123,145)(H,124,140)(H,125,141)(H,126,143)(H,127,147)(H,134,135)(H4,106,107,110)/t67-,68-,69-,70-,71-,72-,73-,74-,75-,76-,77-,78-,79-,84-/m0/s1; Key:DIDCGVRALANKIU-OTEFFYEFSA-N

Alsactide (INN; brand name Synchrodyn 1-17 or simply Synchrodyn; former development code Hoechst 433; also known as alisactide) is a synthetic peptide and analogue of adrenocorticotropic hormone (ACTH) which is used in Italy as a diagnostic agent in kidney function for adrenal insufficiency. Like ACTH, alsactide is thought to act as a non-selective agonist of the melanocortin receptors, including the ACTH receptor (MC_{2}R). However, it appears to show a different profile of receptor selectivity relative to ACTH, as it apparently demonstrated no evidence of inhibition of endogenous ACTH in Addison's disease patients.

== See also ==
- Tetracosactide
