= Sucampo Pharmaceuticals =

Defunct pharmaceutical company

Sucampo Pharmaceuticals, Inc.
- Industry: Pharmaceutical industry
- Founded: 1996; 30 years ago
- Defunct: February 12, 2018; 8 years ago
- Fate: Acquired by Mallinckrodt
- Headquarters: Rockville, Maryland
- Key people: Peter Greenleaf (CEO and (Chairman); Andrew P. Smith (CFO)
- Products: Amitiza
- Revenue: ▲$230 million (2016)
- Net income: ▼$18 million (2016)
- Total assets: ▲$520 million (2016)
- Total equity: ▲$167 million (2016)
- Number of employees: 139 (2017)
- Website: www.sucampo.com

Sucampo Pharmaceuticals, Inc. was a pharmaceutical company headquartered in Rockville, Maryland that focused on gastroenterology, ophthalmology, and oncology-related disorders. In 2018, the company was acquired by Mallinckrodt.

Sucampo had two marketed products, Amitiza, which treats constipation issues and Rescula, which helps treat ocular hypertension and open-angle glaucoma. Takeda Pharmaceutical Company had a license to distribute Rescula globally except for in Japan and China. The company had two Phase III drugs in development for rare diseases — one for Niemann-Pick Type C and the other for familial adenomatous polyposis, which can cause colon cancer if untreated.

== History ==
The company was founded by Ryuji Ueno and Sachiko Kuno in 1996.

In January 2006, the company received approval from the Food and Drug Administration for Amitiza.

In 2010, the company entered into arbitration with its partner, Takeda Pharmaceutical Company, claiming that sales of Amitiza floundered because of a half-hearted marketing effort by Takeda. Sucampo lost the arbitration.

In late 2015, the company moved its headquarters from Bethesda, Maryland to Rockville, Maryland.

In January 2016, the company acquired an option for an exclusive license to a drug to treat familial adenomatous polyposis.

In April 2017, the company acquired Vtesse.

In February 2018, the company was acquired by Mallinckrodt. At that time, the founders owned a combined 30% of the company.
