= Adrenocorticotropic hormone (medication) =

Chemical compound

Clinical data
- Trade names: Acortan, Acthar, Acton, Cortigel, Trofocortina
- AHFS/Drugs.com: International Drug Names

Legal status
- Legal status: In general: ℞ (Prescription only)

Identifiers
- IUPAC name: H-Ser-Tyr-Ser-Met-Glu-His-Phe-Arg-Trp-Gly-Lys-Pro-Val-Gly-Lys-Lys-Arg-Arg-Pro-Val-Lys-Val-Tyr-Pro-Asn-Gly-Ala-Glu-Asp-Glu-Ser-Ala-Glu-Ala-Phe-Pro-Leu-Glu-Phe-OH
- PubChem CID: 16132265
- DrugBank: DB01285
- ChemSpider: none
- ECHA InfoCard: 100.037.286

Chemical and physical data
- Formula: C_{207}H_{308}N_{56}O_{58}S
- Molar mass: 4541.14 g·mol^{−1}

Tetracosactide
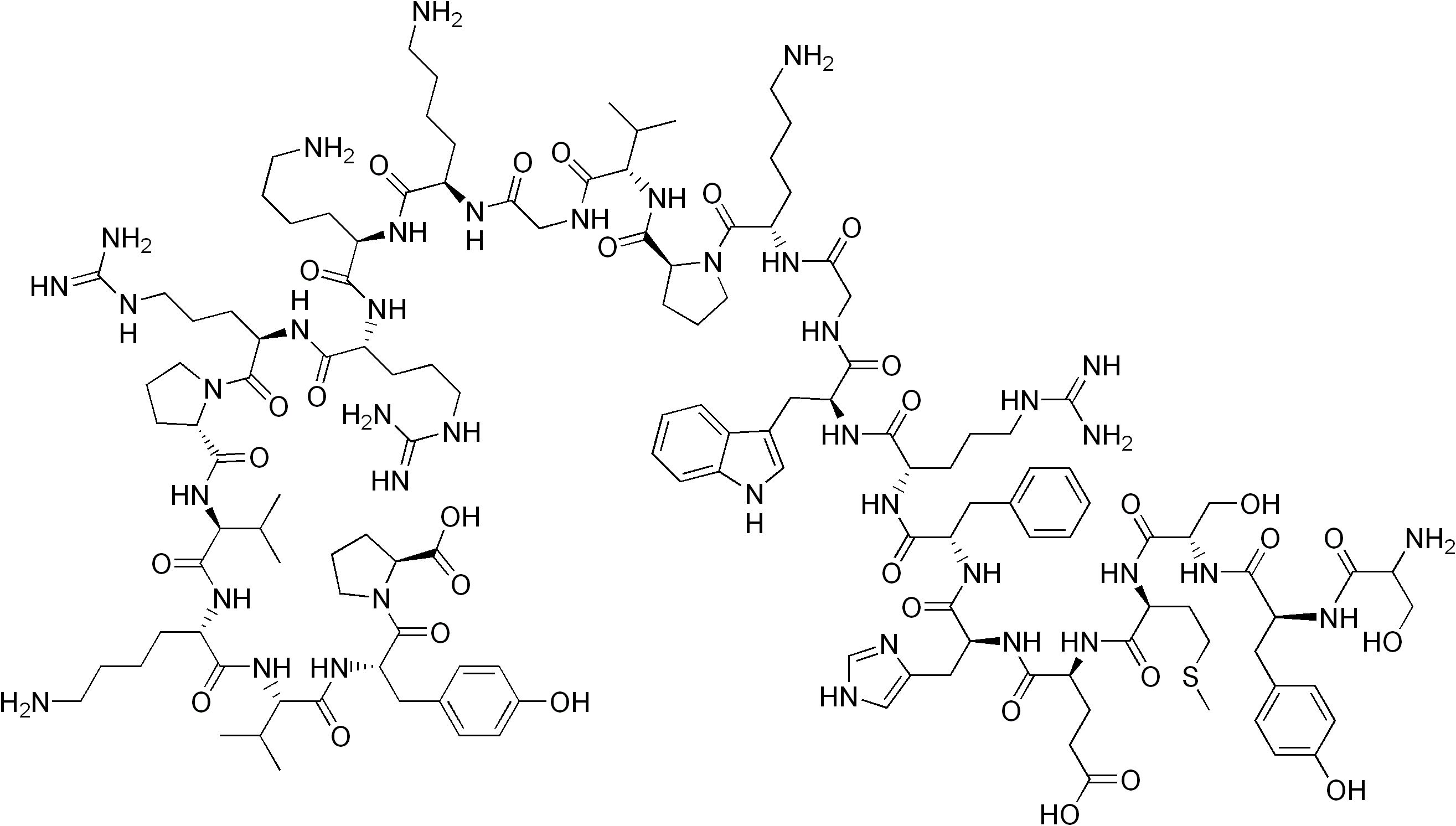

Clinical data
- Trade names: Cortrosyn, Synacthen, Nuvacthen
- Other names: Ba 30920 α^{1–24} corticotrophin Ser-Tyr-Ser-Met-Glu-His-Phe-Arg-Trp-Gly-Lys-Pro-Val-Gly-Lys-Lys-Arg-Arg-Pro-Val-Lys-Val-Tyr-Pro
- AHFS/Drugs.com: International Drug Names
- ATC code: H01AA02 (WHO)

Identifiers
- IUPAC name: L-seryl-L-tyrosyl-L-seryl-L-methionyl-L-α-glutamyl-L-histidyl-L-phenylalanyl-L-arginyl-L-tryptophylglycyl-L-lysyl-L-prolyl-L-valylglycyl-L-lysyl-L-lysyl-L-arginyl-L-arginyl-L-prolyl-L-valyl-L-lysyl-L-valyl-L-tyrosyl-L-proline
- CAS Number: 16960-16-0
- PubChem CID: 16129617
- IUPHAR/BPS: 6965
- DrugBank: DB01284
- ChemSpider: 10481947
- UNII: 72YY86EA29
- KEGG: D00284
- ChEBI: CHEBI:3901
- ECHA InfoCard: 100.037.286

Chemical and physical data
- Formula: C_{136}H_{210}N_{40}O_{31}S
- Molar mass: 2933.49 g·mol^{−1}
- InChI: InChI=1S/C136H210N40O31S/c1-75(2)109(127(200)154-71-106(181)156-88(31-13-17-52-137)114(187)158-89(32-14-18-53-138)115(188)159-91(35-21-56-149-134(142)143)116(189)164-96(37-23-58-151-136(146)147)131(204)175-60-25-39-104(175)126(199)173-111(77(5)6)128(201)163-90(33-15-19-54-139)120(193)171-110(76(3)4)129(202)169-101(65-80-43-47-84(180)48-44-80)132(205)176-61-26-40-105(176)133(206)207)172-125(198)103-38-24-59-174(103)130(203)95(34-16-20-55-140)157-107(182)70-153-113(186)99(66-81-68-152-87-30-12-11-29-85(81)87)167-117(190)92(36-22-57-150-135(144)145)160-121(194)98(63-78-27-9-8-10-28-78)166-123(196)100(67-82-69-148-74-155-82)168-118(191)93(49-50-108(183)184)161-119(192)94(51-62-208-7)162-124(197)102(73-178)170-122(195)97(165-112(185)86(141)72-177)64-79-41-45-83(179)46-42-79/h8-12,27-30,41-48,68-69,74-77,86,88-105,109-111,152,177-180H,13-26,31-40,49-67,70-73,137-141H2,1-7H3,(H,148,155)(H,153,186)(H,154,200)(H,156,181)(H,157,182)(H,158,187)(H,159,188)(H,160,194)(H,161,192)(H,162,197)(H,163,201)(H,164,189)(H,165,185)(H,166,196)(H,167,190)(H,168,191)(H,169,202)(H,170,195)(H,171,193)(H,172,198)(H,173,199)(H,183,184)(H,206,207)(H4,142,143,149)(H4,144,145,150)(H4,146,147,151)/t86?,88-,89-,90+,91-,92+,93+,94+,95+,96-,97+,98+,99+,100+,101+,102+,103+,104+,105+,109+,110+,111+/m1/s1; Key:ZOEFCCMDUURGSE-CQVUSSRSSA-N

Adrenocorticotropic hormone is used as a medication and as diagnostic agent in the ACTH stimulation test.

The form that is purified from pig pituitary glands is known as corticotropin is a medication and naturally occurring polypeptide tropic hormone produced and secreted by the anterior pituitary gland.

The form that is made synthetically is tetracosactide, also known as synacthen, tetracosactrin and cosyntropin. It consists of the first 24 (of a total of 39) amino acids of ACTH and retains full function of the parent peptide. Tetracosactide stimulates the release of corticosteroids such as cortisol from the adrenal glands, and is used for the ACTH stimulation test to assess adrenal gland function.

== Medical uses ==
Both corticotropin and tetracosactide have been used for diagnostic purposes to determine adrenocortical insufficiency, particularly in Addison's disease, via the ACTH stimulation test. However, as of 2015 the US label for corticotropin does not include diagnostic use.

Both corticotropin and tetracosactide have been used for therapeutic purposes. In the US the tetracosactide label is limited to diagnosis but the UK label provides for therapeutic uses.

In the US corticotropin is used to treat epileptic spasms in infants, acute exacerbations of multiple sclerosis in adults; acute episodes of psoriatic arthritis and rheumatoid arthritis and ankylosing spondylitis; in acute exacerbations or as maintenance therapy for collagen disorders like systemic lupus erythematosus and systemic dermatomyositis; for skin conditions like severe erythema multiforme and Stevens–Johnson syndrome; for serum sickness; for severe acute and chronic allergic and inflammatory processes involving the eye such as keratitis, iritis and iridocyclitis, diffuse posterior uveitis, choroiditis, optic neuritis, chorioretinitis, and anterior segment inflammation; sarcoidosis in the lungs; and to treat edema in certain nephrotic syndromes.

In the UK tetracosactide is used for short-term therapy in conditions for which glucocorticoids are usually used but for some reason should not be; some uses include use for people who do not respond to glucocorticoids or cannot tolerate them who have ulcerative colitis, Crohn's disease, juvenile rheumatoid arthritis, rheumatoid arthritis, or osteoarthrosis.

== Contraindications ==
In the US the only contraindication for tetracosactide for diagnostic use is hypersensitivity to ACTH but in the UK, regulators placed contraindications for hypersensitivity to ACTH and additionally, for people with allergic disorders including asthma, acute psychosis, infectious diseases, peptic ulcer, refractory heart failure, Cushing's syndrome, treatment of primary adrenocortical insufficiency and adrenocongenital syndrome.

The same contraindications that were applied in the UK for diagnostic use of tetracosactide, apply for therapeutic use of both tetracosactide and corticotropin in the US and UK.

In addition, the US label for corticotropin for therapeutic uses includes contraindications for people who have recently had surgery, and people with scleroderma, osteoporosis, uncontrolled hypertension, or sensitivity to proteins of porcine origin; in addition the infection diseases systemic fungal infection, ocular herpes simplex, and infants who have congenital infections are specified. The label also notes that people taking corticotropin for immunosuppression should not be given live vaccines.

== Adverse effects ==
People taking corticotropin or tetracosactide are more likely to get infections, and are at risk of hypothalamic-pituitary-axis (HPA) suppression and Cushing's syndrome.

== Pharmacology ==
In the normal situation, ACTH is released from the pituitary gland at the base of the brain. It acts on the adrenal glands to stimulate the production of steroid hormones (glucocorticoids). If the adrenal glands are healthy, a single injection of tetracosactide results in a rise in blood cortisol concentrations in 30 minutes. If the adrenal glands appear not to be working then tetracosactide injection can be given to check whether the problem is due to diseased or damaged adrenals or due to lack of pituitary ACTH.

Tetracosactide stimulates the release of corticosteroids such as cortisol from the adrenal glands, and is used for the ACTH stimulation test to assess adrenal gland function.

== Chemistry ==
The synthetic form consists of the first 24 (of a total of 39) amino acids of ACTH and retains full function of the parent peptide.

== Society and culture ==
=== Approved forms ===
In the US, available forms of animal-derived corticotrophin have included:

- Corticotrophin derived from pituitary glands from pigs, in a gel formulation as well as in a zinc hydrochloride formulation, each first approved in the US in 1955 and subsequently discontinued. In September 2015 ANI Pharmaceuticals and Merck & Co. agreed that ANI would purchase NDA 009854 and NDA 008975 and related trademarks and other assets related to these two versions of corticotrophin from Merck for $75M and ongoing royalties; the transaction closed in January 2016. As of November 2016 ANI was preparing its supplemental NDA to get approval to re-introduce this formulation; in 2015 ANI estimated that the US market for these products was about $1 billion per year, based on sales of Acthar gel.
- Corticotrophin, first approved in 1952 and subsequently discontinued; as of January 2017 this NDA was under control of Parkedale, a subsidiary of King Pharmaceuticals which is in turn a subsidiary of Pfizer.
- Corticotrophin branded as "Acthar", was first approved in 1950 and was subsequently discontinued; as of January 2017 this NDA was under control of Sanofi.
- A corticotrophin was approved in 1957 under NDA 010831, was subsequently discontinued, and as of January 2017 was under control of Organics/Lagrange, a subsidiary of Abbvie via Abbott's acquisition of Solvay's drug business. A generic version under this NDA was approved under ANDA 088772 and was subsequently discontinued, and as of January 2017 was under the control of Actavis.
- A corticotrophin called H.P. Acthar Gel was approved in 1952 and as of January 2017 was under the control of Mallinckrodt. A repository version of H.P. Acthar gel was approved in 2010 and as of January 2017 was also under the control of Mallinkrodt.

Synthetic forms were created as a replacement for the animal-derived products.

In the US, available forms of tetracosactide/cosyntropin, the synthetic form of corticotrophin, have been approved only for diagnostic uses, and have included:

- A branded version called Cortrosyn, which was created and developed by Organon and was approved by the FDA in 1970, and as of January 2017 was under the control of Amphastar Pharmaceuticals, and there were three generic versions under ANDAs, one for Mylan approved in 2009, one for Sandoz/Novartis, approved in 2012, and another for Amphastar under ANDA 016750. This version is a powder that is reconstituted before use.
- A version of cosyntropin in solution (as opposed to powder) was developed by Sandoz/Novartis and was approved under the 505b(2) pathway in 2008; as of January 2017 it had been discontinued.

In the UK, available forms of tetracosactide/cosyntropin, the synthetic form of corticotrophin, have been approved for both therapeutic and diagnostic uses, and have included:

- A version branded Synacthen and provided in solution 250 mcg ampoules, for diagnostic uses, approved in 2008 and as of January 2017 controlled by Mallinckrodt.
- A version branded Synacthen, absorbed on to zinc phosphate, provided in milky white suspension, approved in 2008 and as of January 2017 controlled by Mallinckrodt.

=== Doping ===
As of 2007, it was widely reported that tetracosactide had been used as an illegal performance-enhancing drug by professional cyclists. It is known to be used as a doping agent to increase the secretion of glucocorticoids by adrenal glands.

=== Pricing ===
Mallinckrodt acquired the US rights to the animal-derived form via its acquisition of Questcor Pharmaceuticals in 2014. When Questcor acquired the drug in 2001 it sold for $40 a vial; within a year of the acquisition Questcor raised the price of the drug to $1,500 per vial and to $28,000 by 2013. In 2013, Questcor acquired the US rights to a competing product, Synacthen Depot, from Novartis. In 2014 Mallinckrodt raised the price of Acthar further to $34,000. The Federal Trade Commission and attorneys general from five states sued Mallinckrodt for anti-competitive behavior with regard to the acquisition of Synacthen Depot and the monopolistic pricing of Acthar, and in January 2017 the company settled, agreeing to pay $100 million and to license Synacthen Depot to a competitor. According to Kaiser Health News, Mallinckrodt responded by increasing its Congressional lobbying to $610,000, and its contributions to Congress members to $44,000, in the first quarter of 2017.

In Canada, Synacthen Depot's pricing increased by 2000% in 2015, causing some provincial single payer authorities to delist the drug from funded medications. The increase in the drug's price came after Mallinckrodt acquired Questcor and its drug portfolio, which included the worldwide rights to Synacthen Depot. Prior to the price increase, Mallinckrodt claims that the drug was manufactured at a loss. Some have claimed that the price increase is abusive. The drug had been priced at $33 but rose to $680 per vial. As an off-patent pharmaceutical, a similar drug, differing in formulation, available in Europe, made by a different manufacturer, sells for $8 per vial.

== Research ==
Acthar gel has been proposed as a therapy to treat refractory autoimmune diseases and refractory nephrotic syndrome due to a variety of glomerular diseases.

== Veterinary medicine ==
Both versions of the hormone are also used to perform the ACTH stimulation test to diagnose hypoadrenocorticism in dogs and sometimes cats.
