= Insulin tolerance test =

Medical diagnostic procedure

- Purpose: assess pituitary function/ adrenal function

An insulin tolerance test (ITT) is a medical diagnostic procedure during which insulin is injected into a patient's vein, after which blood glucose is measured at regular intervals. This procedure is performed to assess pituitary function, adrenal function, insulin sensitivity, and sometimes for other purposes. An ITT is usually ordered and interpreted by an endocrinologist.

When used to assess insulin sensitivity, a standard dose of insulin is administered, and blood glucose is monitored with frequent sampling. The plasma glucose disappearance rate (KITT) indicates the degree of whole-body insulin sensitivity, and correlates well with the gold-standard glucose clamp technique.

When used for assessing the integrity of the hypothalamic–pituitary–adrenal axis (HPA), insulin injections are continued to the point of inducing extreme hypoglycemia below 2.2 mmol/L (40 mg/dL). Patient must have symptomatic neuroglycopenia to trigger counter-regulatory cascade. Glucose levels below 2.2 mmol/L are insufficient absent symptoms. The brain must register low glucose levels. In response, adrenocorticotropic hormone (ACTH) and growth hormone (GH) are released as a part of the stress mechanism. ACTH elevation causes the adrenal cortex to release cortisol. Normally, both cortisol and GH serve as counterregulatory hormones, opposing the action of insulin, i.e. acting against the hypoglycemia.

ITT to the point of extreme hypoglycemia is considered to be the gold standard for assessing the integrity of the HPA. Sometimes ITT is performed to assess the adrenal function, e.g. before surgery. It is assumed that the ability to respond to insulin-induced hypoglycemia translates into appropriate cortisol rise in the stressful event of acute illness or major surgery. The extreme hypoglycemic version of the ITT is potentially very dangerous and must be undertaken with great care, because it can iatrogenically induce the equivalent of a diabetic coma. A health professional must attend it at all times. Other provocation tests which cause much less release of growth hormone include the use of glucagon, arginine and clonidine.

== Side effects ==
Side effects include sweating, palpitations, loss of consciousness and rarely convulsions due to severe hypoglycemia which may cause coma. If extreme symptoms are present, glucose should be given intravenously. In subjects with no adrenal reserve an Addisonian crisis may occur. For cortisol stimulation, the ACTH stimulation test has much less risk.

== Contraindications ==
Insulin tolerance test contraindications are:

- This test should not be performed on children outside a specialist pediatric endocrine unit.
- Ischemic heart disease
- Epilepsy
- Severe panhypopituitarism, hypoadrenalism
- Hypothyroidism impairs the GH and cortisol response. Patients should have corticosteroid replacement commenced prior to thyroxine as the latter has been reported to precipitate an Addisonian crisis with dual deficiency. If adrenal insufficiency is confirmed, the need for a repeat ITT may need to be reconsidered after 3 months thyroxine therapy.

== Interpretation ==
The test cannot be interpreted unless hypoglycaemia (< 2.2 mmol/L (or) < 40 mg/dL) is achieved.

=== Hypopituitarism ===
An adequate cortisol response is defined as a rise to greater than 550 nmol/L. Patients with impaired cortisol responses (less than 550 but greater than 400 nmol/L) may only need steroid cover for major illnesses or stresses. An adequate GH response occurs with an absolute response exceeding 20 mU/L.

=== Cushing's syndrome ===
There will be a rise of less than 170 nmol/L above the fluctuations of basal levels of cortisol.

== See also ==
- ACTH stimulation test
- Hypopituitarism
- Triple bolus test
