= ACTH stimulation test =

Medical test to assess adrenal gland function

- Synonyms: Synacthen test
- OPS-301 code: 1-797
- MedlinePlus: 003696
- LOINC: 34541-3, 34542-1

The ACTH test (also called the cosyntropin, tetracosactide, or Synacthen test) is a medical test usually requested and interpreted by endocrinologists to assess the functioning of the adrenal glands' stress response by measuring the adrenal response to adrenocorticotropic hormone (ACTH; corticotropin) or another corticotropic agent such as tetracosactide (cosyntropin, tetracosactrin; Synacthen) or alsactide (Synchrodyn). ACTH is a hormone produced in the anterior pituitary gland that stimulates the adrenal glands to release cortisol, dehydroepiandrosterone (DHEA), dehydroepiandrosterone sulfate (DHEA-S), and aldosterone.

During the test, a small amount of synthetic ACTH is injected, and the amount of cortisol (and sometimes aldosterone) that the adrenals produce in response is measured. This test may cause mild side effects in some individuals.

This test is used to diagnose or exclude primary and secondary adrenal insufficiency, Addison's disease, and related conditions. In addition to quantifying adrenal insufficiency, the test can distinguish whether the cause is adrenal (low cortisol and aldosterone production) or pituitary (low ACTH production). The insulin tolerance test is recognized as the gold standard assay of adrenal insufficiency, but due to the cumbersome requirement for a two-hour test and the risks of seizures or myocardial infarction, the ACTH stimulation test is commonly used as an easier, safer, though not as accurate, alternative. The test is extremely sensitive (97% at 95% specificity) to primary adrenal insufficiency, but less so to secondary adrenal insufficiency (57–61% at 95% specificity); while secondary adrenal insufficiency may thus be dismissed by some interpreters on the basis of the test, additional testing may be called for if the probability of secondary adrenal insufficiency is particularly high.

Adrenal insufficiency is a potentially life-threatening condition. Treatment should be initiated as soon as the diagnosis is confirmed, or sooner if the patient presents in apparent adrenal crisis.

== Versions of the test ==
This test can be given as a low-dose short test, a conventional-dose short test, or as a prolonged-stimulation test.

In the low-dose short test, 1 μg of an ACTH drug is injected into the patient. In the conventional-dose short test, 250 μg of drug are injected. Both of these short tests last for about an hour and provide the same information. Studies have shown the cortisol response of the adrenals is the same for the low-dose and conventional-dose tests.

The prolonged-stimulation test, which is also called a long conventional-dose test, can last up to 48 hours. This form of the test can differentiate between primary, secondary, and tertiary adrenal insufficiency. This form of the test is rarely performed because earlier testing of cortisol and ACTH levels in association with the short test may provide all the necessary information.

== Preparation ==
The test should not be given if on glucocorticoids or adrenal extract supplement, as these will affect test results. Stress and recently administered radioisotope scans can artificially increase levels and may invalidate test results. Spironolactone, contraceptives, licorice, estrogen, androgen (including DHEA) and progesterone therapy may also affect both aldosterone and cortisol stimulation test results. To stimulate aldosterone, consumption of salt should be reduced to a minimum, and foods high in sodium avoided for 24 hours prior to testing. Women should ideally undergo testing during the first week of their menstrual cycle as aldosterone (and occasionally cortisol) may be falsely elevated in the luteal cycle secondary to progesterone inhibition, leading to a compensatory rise in aldosterone levels.

== Administration ==
Traditionally, cortisol and ACTH levels (separate lavender top tube) are drawn at baseline (time = 0). Next, synthetic ACTH or another corticotropic agent is injected IM or IV, depending on the agent. Approximately 20 mL of heparinized venous blood is collected at 30 and 60 minutes after the synthetic ACTH injection to measure cortisol levels.

ACTH samples are kept on ice and sent immediately to the laboratory, whereas cortisol does not need to be kept on ice.

== Potential side effects ==
Commonly reported reactions are nausea, anxious sweating, dizziness, itchy skin, redness and or swelling of injection site, palpitations (a fast or fluttering heart beat), and facial flushing (may also include arms and torso), but should disappear within a few hours. Rarely seen, but serious side effects include rash, fainting, headache, blurred vision, severe swelling, severe dizziness, trouble breathing, irregular heartbeat.

== Interpretation of results ==
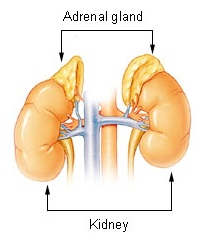
The adrenal glands sit atop the kidneys.

=== Cosyntropin stimulation testing ===
In healthy individuals, the cortisol level should increase above 18–20 μg/dl within 60 minutes on a 250 mcg cosyntropin stimulation test.

For standardization across laboratories, the Short Synacthen Test is preferably performed in the morning (between 8:00 AM and 10:00 AM) to account for the diurnal peak of cortisol secretion. Baseline cortisol is drawn at time 0, with follow‑up samples at 30 minutes (and optionally 60 minutes) after administration of 250 μg synthetic ACTH. An adequate response is generally defined as a peak serum cortisol ≥ 500–550 nmol/L (approximately 18–20 μg/dL) or an increment ≥ 200 nmol/L, thresholds that improve diagnostic accuracy for adrenal insufficiency.

Interpretation for primary adrenal insufficiency, Addison's disease

In Addison's disease, both the cortisol and aldosterone levels are low, and the cortisol will not rise during the cosyntropin stimulation test.

Interpretation for secondary adrenal insufficiency

In secondary adrenal insufficiency, due to exogenous steroid administration suppressing pituitary production of ACTH or due to primary pituitary disorder causing insufficient ACTH production, the adrenal glands will atrophy over time and cortisol production will fall and patients will fail stimulation testing. Early in the development of secondary adrenal insufficiency, the adrenals may not have atrophied and can still stimulate, resulting in a normal cosyntropin stimulation test.

If secondary adrenal insufficiency is diagnosed, the insulin tolerance test (ITT) or the CRH (corticotropin-releasing hormone) stimulation test can be used to distinguish between a hypothalamic (tertiary) and pituitary (secondary) cause but is rarely used in clinical practice.

=== ACTH plasma test plus cortisol stimulation ===
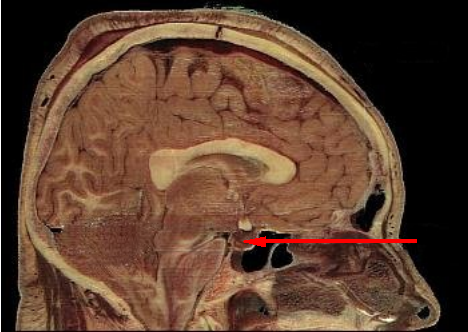
Location of the pituitary gland

Measuring a morning, fasting ACTH level helps assess for the etiology of adrenal insufficiency.

Interpretation for primary adrenal insufficiency and Addison's disease

ACTH will be high – usually well above upper limits of reference range.

Interpretation for secondary adrenal insufficiency

ACTH will be low – usually below 35, but most people with secondary fall within the range limit. This is inappropriately normal for the low cortisol level.

In some cases, the actual cause of low ACTH is from low CRH in the hypothalamus. It is possible to have separate ACTH and CRH impairment such as can happen in a head injury.

=== Aldosterone stimulation ===
The ACTH stimulation test is occasionally used to test adrenal production of aldosterone at the same time as cortisol to also help in determining if primary (hyperreninemic) or secondary (hyporeninemic) hypoaldosteronism is present. Human ACTH has a slight stimulatory effect on aldosterone, but the amount of synthetic ACTH given in the stimulation is equivalent to more than a whole days production of natural ACTH, so the aldosterone response can be easily measured in blood serum. Same as cortisol, aldosterone should double from a respectable base value (around 20 ng/dl, must fast salt 24 hours and sit upright for blood draw) in a healthy individual.

Interpretation for primary aldosterone deficiency

The aldosterone response in the ACTH stimulation test is blunted or absent in patients with primary adrenal insufficiency including Addison's disease. The base value is usually in the mid-teens or less and rise to less than double the base value thus indicating primary hypoaldosteronism (sodium low, potassium and renin enzyme will be high) and is an indicator of primary adrenal insufficiency or Addison's disease.

Interpretation for secondary aldosterone deficiency

Aldosterone response of several factors from a low base value. This factoring indicates secondary hypoaldosteronism (sodium low, potassium and renin enzyme will be low). Usually doubling to quadrupling from a low base aldosterone value is what is seen in secondary adrenal insufficiency. Decoupling of aldosterone in the ACTH stimulation test is possible (i.e. 2 ng/dl stimming to 20). A result of doubling or more of aldosterone may help in tandem with a cortisol stimulation that doubled or more confirm a diagnosis of secondary adrenal insufficiency. In rare cases, an aldosterone stimulation which did not double, but with the presence of low potassium, low renin and low ACTH indicates atrophy of aldosterone production from the prolonged lack of renin.

Similar to the cortisol stimulation in ACTH deficiency, the test interpreter may lack knowledge of how to properly interpret for secondary hypoaldosteronism and think a result of aldosterone doubling or more from a low base value is good.

== Future perspectives ==
Recent data showed that Synacthen test results can be used to predict future recovery of HPA axis function in patients with reversible causes of Adrenal Insufficiency.

== Other hormones and chemicals that will rise in the ACTH stimulation test ==
- Progesterone – precursor to cortisol and aldosterone
- 17α-Hydroxyprogesterone – a progestogen steroid hormone related to progesterone
- Luteinizing hormone – a pituitary hormone that stimulates sex hormone production
- DHEA and DHEA-S – androgen hormones produced in the adrenal glands

== Simple diagnostic chart ==
Source of pathology	CRH	ACTH	DHEA	DHEA-S	Cortisol	Aldosterone	Renin	Na	K	Causes^{5}
hypothalamus (tertiary)^{1}	low	low	low	low	low^{3}	low	low	low	low	tumor of the hypothalamus (adenoma), antibodies, environment, head injury, abrupt corticosteroid withdrawal
pituitary (secondary)	high^{2}	low	low	low	low^{3}	low	low	low	low	tumor of the pituitary (adenoma), antibodies, environment, head injury, surgical removal^{6}, Sheehan's syndrome
adrenal glands (primary)^{7}	high	high	high	high	low^{4}	low	high	low	high	tumor of the adrenal (adenoma), stress, antibodies, environment, Addison's, injury, surgical removal

1	Automatically includes diagnosis of secondary (hypopituitarism)
2	Only if CRH production in the hypothalamus is intact
3	Value doubles or more in stimulation
4	Value less than doubles in stimulation
5	Most common, doesn't include all possible causes
6	Usually because of very large tumor (macroadenoma)
7	Includes Addison's disease

== Veterinary medicine ==
The test is also used to diagnose hypoadrenocorticism in dogs and sometimes cats.

== See also ==
- Dexamethasone suppression test
- Insulin tolerance test, another test used to identify sub-types of adrenal insufficiency
- Metyrapone, a drug used in the diagnosis of adrenal insufficiency
- Triple bolus test
- Renin, enzyme that converts angiotensinogen 1 to angiotensin 2, a precursor to aldosterone
- Renin–angiotensin–aldosterone system
- HPA axis, explains the connections of the hypothalamus, pituitary and adrenal glands
- Hypopituitarism
- Pituitary adenoma
- Adrenal adenoma
- Corticorelin
