= Unoprostone =

Chemical compound

Clinical data
- Trade names: Rescula
- AHFS/Drugs.com: Micromedex Detailed Consumer Information
- Routes of administration: Topical (eye drops)
- ATC code: S01EE02 (WHO)

Legal status
- Legal status: US: Discontinued

Pharmacokinetic data
- Elimination half-life: 14 min
- Excretion: Renal

Identifiers
- IUPAC name: (Z)-7-[(1R,2R,3R,5S)-3,5-dihydroxy-2-(3-oxodecyl) cyclopentyl]hept-5-enoic acid
- CAS Number: 120373-36-6 120373-24-2 (isopropyl ester)
- PubChem CID: 5311236
- DrugBank: DB06826
- ChemSpider: 4470755
- UNII: 6X4F561V3W
- KEGG: D08661
- ChEMBL: ChEMBL1201407
- CompTox Dashboard (EPA): DTXSID80905120
- ECHA InfoCard: 100.227.145

Chemical and physical data
- Formula: C_{22}H_{38}O_{5}
- Molar mass: 382.541 g·mol^{−1}
- 3D model (JSmol): Interactive image
- SMILES: O=C(O)CCC/C=C\C[C@H]1[C@@H](O)C[C@@H](O)[C@@H]1CCC(=O)CCCCCCC
- InChI: InChI=1S/C22H38O5/c1-2-3-4-5-8-11-17(23)14-15-19-18(20(24)16-21(19)25)12-9-6-7-10-13-22(26)27/h6,9,18-21,24-25H,2-5,7-8,10-16H2,1H3,(H,26,27)/b9-6-/t18-,19-,20+,21-/m1/s1; Key:TVHAZVBUYQMHBC-SNHXEXRGSA-N

Unoprostone (INN) is a prostaglandin analogue. Its isopropyl ester, unoprostone isopropyl, was marketed under the trade name Rescula for the management of open-angle glaucoma and ocular hypertension.

It was approved by the Food and Drug Administration in 2000.In 2009, Sucampo Pharmaceuticals acquired the rights to the drug in the U.S. and Canada.

In 2015, the drug was discontinued in the U.S.
