= Captopril challenge test =

Non-invasive medical test

- Captopril chemical structure.
- Purpose: measures the change in renin plasma-levels

The captopril challenge test (CCT) is a non-invasive medical test that measures the change in renin plasma-levels in response to administration of captopril, an angiotensin converting enzyme inhibitor. It is used to assist in the diagnosis of renal artery stenosis. It is not generally considered a useful test for children, and more suitable options are available for adult cases.

== Procedure ==
Plasma concentration of renin is measured prior to and following the administration of captopril. The CCT is considered positive if the renin levels increase substantially or the baseline renin level is abnormally high.

=== In adults ===
CCT in adults is known to have high sensitivity, but a low specificity.

Subtraction angiography is considered a more suitable test for renal artery stenosis in adults.

== See also ==
- Captopril suppression test - used to diagnose primary aldosteronism
