= Captopril suppression test =

Medical test for aldosterone levels

- Aldosterone (chemical structure) is measured in the CST.
- Purpose: measures plasma levels of aldosterone.

The captopril suppression test (CST) is a non-invasive medical test that measures plasma levels of aldosterone. Aldosterone production is suppressed by captopril through the renin–angiotensin–aldosterone system. CST results are used to assist in the diagnososis of primary aldosteronism (Conn syndrome).

== See also ==
- Captopril challenge test – used to diagnose renal artery stenosis
