= Phosphogluconate dehydrogenase (decarboxylating) =

Protein

phosphogluconate dehydrogenase (decarboxylating)
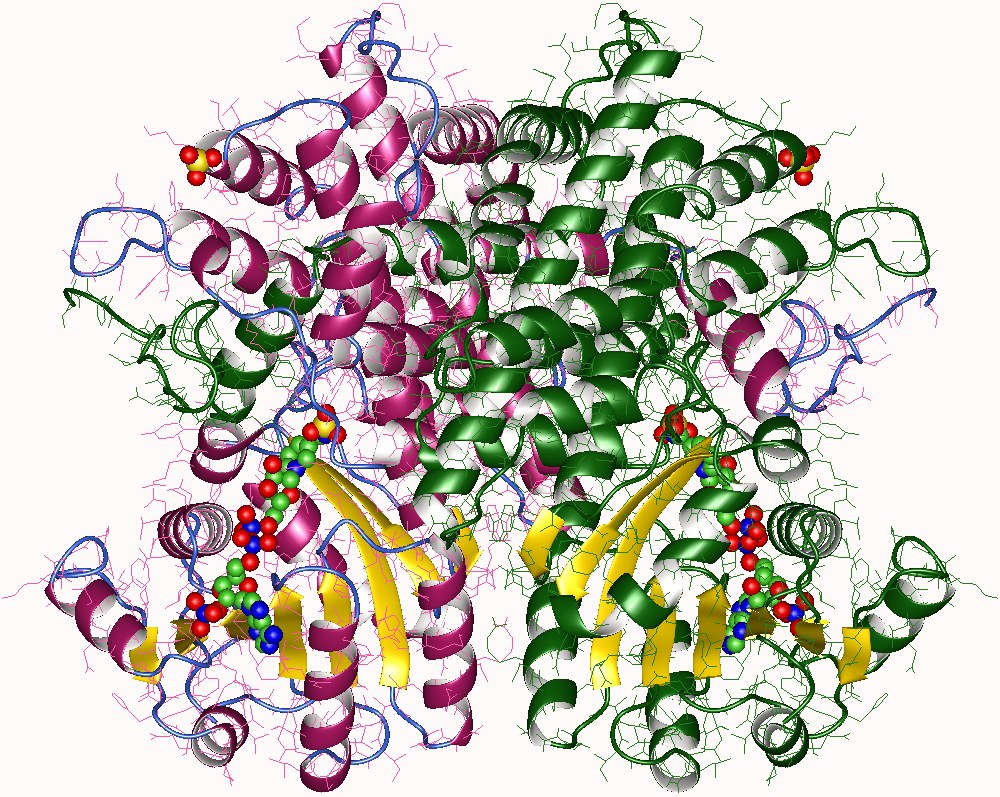
- Phosphogluconate dehydrogenase dimer, Sheep

Identifiers
- EC no.: 1.1.1.44
- CAS no.: 9073-95-4

Databases
- IntEnz: IntEnz view
- BRENDA: BRENDA entry
- ExPASy: NiceZyme view
- KEGG: KEGG entry
- MetaCyc: metabolic pathway
- PRIAM: profile
- PDB structures: RCSB PDB PDBe PDBsum
- Gene Ontology: AmiGO / QuickGO
Search
- PMC: articles
- PubMed: articles
- NCBI: proteins

In enzymology, a phosphogluconate dehydrogenase (decarboxylating) (EC 1.1.1.44) is an enzyme that catalyzes the chemical reaction

6-phospho-D-gluconate + NADP^{+} $\rightleftharpoons$ D-ribulose 5-phosphate + CO_{2} + NADPH

6-Phosphogluconic acid
+ NADP^{+}
H^{+}
H^{+}
Ribulose 5-phosphate
+ CO_{2} + NADPH

The two substrates of this enzyme are 6-phosphogluconic acid and oxidised nicotinamide adenine dinucleotide phosphate (NADP^{+}). Its products are ribulose-5-phosphate, carbon dioxide, reduced NADPH, and a proton.

This enzyme belongs to the family of oxidoreductases, specifically those acting on the CH-OH group of donor with NAD^{+} or NADP^{+} as acceptor. The systematic name of this enzyme class is 6-phospho-D-gluconate:NADP^{+} 2-oxidoreductase (decarboxylating). Other names in common use include phosphogluconic acid dehydrogenase, 6-phosphogluconic dehydrogenase, 6-phosphogluconic carboxylase, 6-phosphogluconate dehydrogenase (decarboxylating), and 6-phospho-D-gluconate dehydrogenase. This enzyme participates in pentose phosphate pathway. It employs one cofactor, manganese.

== Enzyme Structure ==
The general structure, as well as several critical residues, on 6-phosphogluconate dehydrogenase appear to be well conserved over various species. The enzyme is a dimer, with each subunit containing three domains. The N-terminal coenzyme binding domain contains a Rossmann fold with additional α/β units. The second domain consists of a number of alpha helical structures, and the C-terminal domain consists of a short tail. The tails of the two subunits interact with each other to form a mobile lid on the enzyme's active site.

As of late 2007, 11 structures have been solved for this class of enzymes, with PDB accession codes 1PGJ, 1PGN, 1PGO, 1PGP, 1PGQ, 2IYO, 2IYP, 2IZ0, 2IZ1, 2P4Q, and 2PGD.

== Enzyme Mechanism ==
The conversion of 6-phosphogluconate and NADP to ribulose 5-phosphate, carbon dioxide, and NADPH is believed to follow a sequential mechanism with ordered product release. 6-phosphogluconate is first oxidized to 3-keto-6-phosphogluconate and NADPH is formed and released. Then, the intermediate is decarboxylated, yielding a 1,2-enediol of ribulose 5-phosphate, which tautomerizes to form ribulose 5-phosphate. High levels of NADPH are believed to inhibit the enzyme, while 6-phosphogluconate acts to activate the enzyme.

== Biological Function ==
6-phosphogluconate dehydrogenase is involved in the production of ribulose 5-phosphate, which is used in nucleotide synthesis, and functions in the pentose phosphate pathway as the main generator of cellular NADPH.

== Disease Relevance ==
Since NADPH is required by both thioredoxin reductase and glutathione reductase to reduce oxidized thioredoxin and glutathionine, 6-phosphogluconate dehydrogenase is believed to be involved in protecting cells from oxidative damage. Several studies have linked oxidative stress to diseases such as Alzheimer's disease, as well as cancer, These studies have found phosphogluconate dehydrogenase activity to be up-regulated, both in tumor cells and in relevant cortical regions of Alzheimer's patient brains, most likely as a compensatory reaction to highly oxidative environments.

Recently, phosphogluconate dehydrogenase has been posited as a potential drug target for African sleeping sickness (trypanosomiasis). The pentose phosphate pathway protects the trypanosomes from oxidative stress via the generation of NADPH and provides carbohydrate intermediates used in nucleotide synthesis. Structural differences between mammalian and trypanosome 6-phosphogluconate dehydrogenase have allowed for the development of selective inhibitors of the enzyme. Phosphorylated carbohydrate substrate and transition state analogues, non-carbohydrate substrate analogues and triphenylmethane-based compounds are currently being explored.

== See also ==
- 6-Phosphogluconate dehydrogenase an enzyme that catalyses the same reaction but uses the cofactor NAD^{+}
