= Entner–Doudoroff pathway =

Series of interconnected biochemical reactions

Diagram of the Entner–Doudoroff pathway (KDPG: 2-keto-3-deoxy-6-phosphogluconate)

The Entner–Doudoroff pathway (ED Pathway) is a metabolic pathway that is most notable in Gram-negative bacteria, certain Gram-positive bacteria and archaea. Glucose is the substrate in the ED pathway and, through a series of enzyme assisted chemical reactions, is catabolized into pyruvate. Entner and Doudoroff (1952) and MacGee and Doudoroff (1954) first reported the ED pathway in the bacterium Pseudomonas saccharophila. While originally thought to be just an alternative to glycolysis (EMP) and the pentose phosphate pathway (PPP), some studies now suggest that the original role of the EMP may have originally been about anabolism and repurposed over time to catabolism, meaning the ED pathway may be the older pathway. Recent studies have also shown the prevalence of the ED pathway may be more widespread than first predicted with evidence supporting the presence of the pathway in cyanobacteria, ferns, algae, mosses, and plants. Specifically, there is direct evidence that Hordeum vulgare (barley) uses the Entner–Doudoroff pathway.

Distinct features of the Entner–Doudoroff pathway are that it:

- Uses the unique enzymes 6-phosphogluconate dehydratase, 2-keto-3-deoxy-6-phosphogluconate aldolase (KDPG aldolase), and other common metabolic enzymes to other metabolic pathways, to catabolize glucose to pyruvate.
- In the process of breaking down glucose, a net yield of 1 ATP is formed per every one glucose molecule processed, as well as 1 NADH and 1 NADPH. In comparison, glycolysis has a net yield of 2 ATP molecules and 2 NADH molecules per every one glucose molecule metabolized. This difference in energy production may be offset by the difference in protein amount needed per pathway.

== Archaeal variations ==
Archaea have variants of the Entner–Doudoroff Pathway. These variants are called the semiphosphorylative ED (spED) and the nonphosphorylative ED (npED):

- spED is found in halophilic euryarchaea and Clostridium species.
- In spED, the difference is where phosphorylation occurs. In the standard ED, phosphorylation occurs at the first step from glucose to G6P. In spED, the glucose is first oxidized to gluconate via a glucose dehydrogenase. Next, gluconate dehydratase converts gluconate into 2-keto-3-deoxygluconate (KDG). The next step is where phosphorylation occurs as KDG kinase converts KDG into KDPG. KDPG is then cleaved into glyceraldehyde 3-phosphate (GAP) and pyruvate via KDPG aldolase and follows the same EMP pathway as the standard ED. This pathway produces the same amount of ATP as the standard ED.
- npED is found in thermoacidophilic Sulfolobus, Euryarchaeota Tp. acidophilum, and Picrophilus species.
- In npED, there is no phosphorylation at all. The pathway is the same as spED, but instead of phosphorylation occurring at KDG, KDG is instead cleaved into pyruvate and glyceraldehyde (GA) via KDG aldolase. From here, GA is oxidized via GA dehydrogenase into glycerate. The glycerate is phosphorylated by glycerate kinase into 2PG. 2PG then follows the same pathway as ED and is converted into pyruvate via enolase and pyruvate kinase. In this pathway, though, there is no ATP produced.

Some archaea such as Crenarchaeota Sul. solfataricus and Tpt. tenax have what is called branched ED. In branched ED, the organism have both spED and npED that are both operative and work in parallel.

== Organisms that use the Entner–Doudoroff pathway ==
There are several bacteria that use the Entner–Doudoroff pathway for metabolism of glucose and are unable to catabolize via glycolysis (e.g., therefore lacking essential glycolytic enzymes such as phosphofructokinase as seen in Pseudomonas). Genera in which the pathway is prominent include Gram-negative, as listed below, Gram-positive bacteria such as Enterococcus faecalis, as well as several in the Archaea, the second distinct branch of the prokaryotes (and the "third domain of life", after the prokaryotic Eubacteria and the eukaryotes). Due to the low energy yield of the ED pathway, anaerobic bacteria seem to mainly use glycolysis while aerobic and facultative anaerobes are more likely to have the ED pathway. This is thought to be due to the fact that aerobic and facultative anaerobes have other non-glycolytic pathways for creating ATP such as oxidative phosphorylation. Thus, the ED pathway is favored due to the lesser amounts of proteins required. While anaerobic bacteria must rely on the glycolysis pathway to create a greater percentage of their required ATP; thus, its 2 ATP production is more favored over the ED pathway's 1 ATP production.

Examples of bacteria using the pathway are:

- Pseudomonas, a genus of Gram-negative bacteria
- Azotobacter, a genus of Gram-negative bacteria
- Rhizobium, a plant root-associated and plant differentiation-active genus of Gram-negative bacteria
- Agrobacterium, a plant pathogen (oncogenic) genus of Gram-negative bacteria, also of biotechnologic use
- Escherichia coli, a Gram-negative bacterium
- Enterococcus faecalis, a Gram-positive bacterium
- Zymomonas mobilis, a Gram-negative facultative anaerobe
- Xanthomonas campestris, a Gram-negative bacterium which uses this pathway as main pathway for providing energy.

To date, there is evidence of Eukaryotes using the pathway, suggesting it may be more widespread than previously thought:

- Hordeum vulgare, barley uses the Entner–Duodoroff pathway.
- Phaeodactylum tricornutum diatom model species presents functional phosphogluconate dehydratase and dehoxyphosphogluconate aldolase genes in its genome

The Entner–Doudoroff pathway is present in many species of Archaea (caveat, see following), whose metabolisms "resemble... in [their] complexity those of Bacteria and lower Eukarya", and often include both this pathway and the Embden–Meyerhof–Parnas pathway of glycolysis, except most often as unique, modified variants.

== Catalyzing enzymes ==
=== Conversion of glucose to glucose-6-phosphate ===
The first step in ED is phosphorylation of glucose by a family of enzymes called hexokinases to form glucose 6-phosphate (G6P). This reaction consumes ATP, but it acts to keep the glucose concentration low, promoting continuous transport of glucose into the cell through the plasma membrane transporters. In addition, it blocks the glucose from leaking out – the cell lacks transporters for G6P, and free diffusion out of the cell is prevented due to the charged nature of G6P. Glucose may alternatively be formed from the phosphorolysis or hydrolysis of intracellular starch or glycogen.

In animals, an isozyme of hexokinase called glucokinase is also used in the liver, which has a much lower affinity for glucose (K_{m} in the vicinity of normal glycemia), and differs in regulatory properties. The different substrate affinity and alternate regulation of this enzyme are a reflection of the role of the liver in maintaining blood sugar levels.

Cofactors: Mg^{2+}

=== Conversion of glucose-6-phosphate to 6-phosphogluconolactone ===
The G6P is then converted to 6-phosphogluconolactone (6PGL) in the presence of enzyme glucose-6-phosphate dehydrogenase (an oxido-reductase) with the presence of co-enzyme nicotinamide adenine dinucleotide phosphate (NADP^{+}), which will be reduced to NADPH along with a free hydrogen atom H^{+}.

=== Conversion of 6-phosphogluconolactone to 6-phosphogluconic acid ===
The 6PGL is converted into 6-phosphogluconic acid in the presence of enzyme hydrolase.

=== Conversion of 6-phosphogluconic acid to 2-keto-3-deoxy-6-phosphogluconate ===
The 6-phosphogluconic acid is converted to 2-keto-3-deoxy-6-phosphogluconate (KDPG) in the presence of enzyme 6-phosphogluconate dehydratase; in the process, a water molecule is released.

=== Conversion of 2-keto-3-deoxy-6-phosphogluconate to pyruvate and glyceraldehyde-3-phosphate ===
The KDPG is then converted into pyruvate and glyceraldehyde-3-phosphate (G3P) in the presence of enzyme KDPG aldolase. For the pyruvate, the ED pathway ends here, and the pyruvate then goes into further metabolic pathways (TCA cycle, ETC cycle, etc).

The other product, G3P, is further converted by entering into the glycolysis pathway, via which it, too, gets converted into pyruvate for further metabolism.

=== Conversion of glyceraldehyde-3-phosphate to 1,3-bisphosphoglycerate ===
The G3P is converted to 1,3-bisphosphoglycerate in the presence of enzyme glyceraldehyde-3-phosphate dehydrogenase (an oxido-reductase).

The aldehyde groups of the triose sugars are oxidised, and inorganic phosphate is added to them, forming 1,3-bisphosphoglycerate.

The hydrogen is used to reduce two molecules of NAD^{+}, a hydrogen carrier, to give NADH + H^{+} for each triose.

Hydrogen atom balance and charge balance are both maintained because the phosphate (P_{i}) group actually exists in the form of a hydrogen phosphate anion (HPO_{4}^{2−}), which dissociates to contribute the extra H^{+} ion and gives a net charge of -3 on both sides.

=== Conversion of 1,3-bisphosphoglycerate to 3-phosphoglycerate ===
This step is the enzymatic transfer of a phosphate group from 1,3-bisphosphoglycerate to ADP by phosphoglycerate kinase, forming ATP and 3-phosphoglycerate.

=== Conversion of 3-phosphoglycerate to 2-phosphoglycerate ===
Phosphoglycerate mutase isomerises 3-phosphoglycerate into 2-phosphoglycerate.

=== Conversion of 2-phosphoglycerate to phosphoenolpyruvate ===
Enolase next converts 2-phosphoglycerate to phosphoenolpyruvate. This reaction is an elimination reaction involving an E1cB mechanism.

Cofactors: 2 Mg^{2+}: one "conformational" ion to coordinate with the carboxylate group of the substrate, and one "catalytic" ion that participates in the dehydration.

=== Conversion of phosphoenol pyruvate to pyruvate ===
A final substrate-level phosphorylation now forms a molecule of pyruvate and a molecule of ATP by means of the enzyme pyruvate kinase. This serves as an additional regulatory step, similar to the phosphoglycerate kinase step.

Cofactors: Mg^{2+}
