= 6-phosphogluconolactonase =

Cytosolic enzyme

PGLS

Identifiers
- Aliases: PGLS, Pgls, 1110030K05Rik, AI447866, Plgs, 6PGL, HEL-S-304, 6-phosphogluconolactonase
- External IDs: OMIM: 604951; MGI: 1913421; GeneCards: PGLS
Enzyme activity
EC #	BRENDA	ExPASy	KEGG	MetaCyc
3.1.1.31	↗	↗	↗	↗

Gene location (Human)
Chr.	Chromosome 19 (human)
Band	19p13.11	Start	17,511,636 bp
Band	19p13.11	End	17,521,288 bp

Gene location (Mouse)
Chr.	Chromosome 8 (mouse)
Band	8 B3.3|8	Start	72,044,820 bp
Band	8 B3.3|8	End	72,053,736 bp
RNA expression pattern
Bgee	Human / Mouse (ortholog); Top expressed in: granulocyte; mucosa of transverse colon; monocyte; right adrenal gland; right adrenal cortex; left adrenal cortex; stromal cell of endometrium; skin of abdomen; skin of leg; blood / Top expressed in: lip; right kidney; choroid plexus of fourth ventricle; embryo; ventricular zone; tibiofemoral joint; lacrimal gland; brown adipose tissue; esophagus; thymus; More reference expression data
BioGPS	n/a
Gene ontology
Molecular function	protein binding; hydrolase activity; 6-phosphogluconolactonase activity
Cellular component	cytosol; extracellular exosome; cytoplasm
Biological process	pentose-phosphate shunt; pentose-phosphate shunt, oxidative branch; carbohydrate metabolic process
Sources:Amigo / QuickGO
Orthologs
Databases	NCBI: entry; OMA: entry
Species	Human	Mouse
Entrez	25796	66171
Ensembl	ENSG00000130313	ENSMUSG00000031807
UniProt	O95336	Q9CQ60
RefSeq (mRNA)	NM_012088	NM_001294269; NM_025396
RefSeq (protein)	NP_036220	NP_001281198; NP_079672
Location (UCSC)	Chr 19: 17.51 – 17.52 Mb	Chr 8: 72.04 – 72.05 Mb
PubMed search
- Wikidata
View/Edit Human	View/Edit Mouse

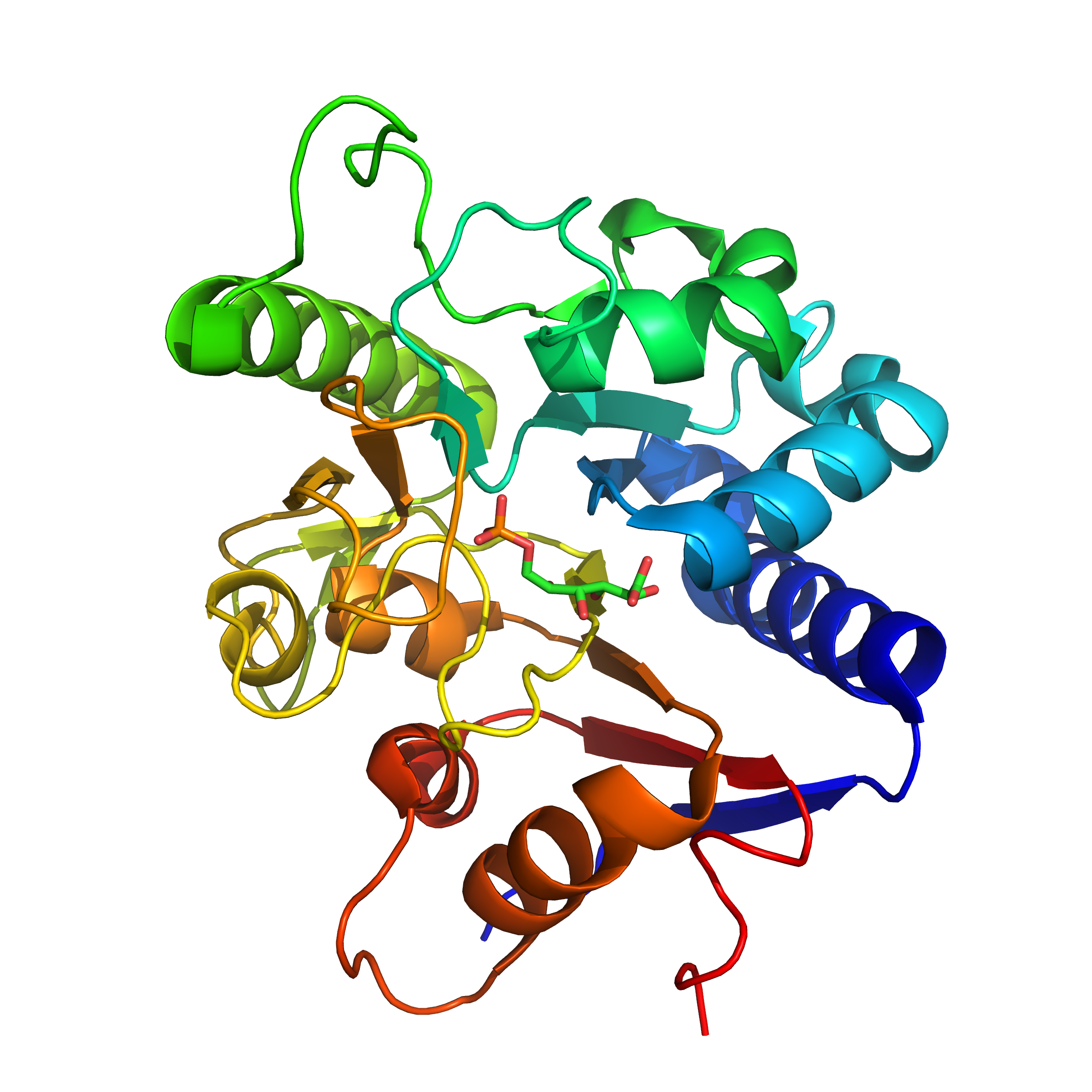
Crystallized monomer of 6-phosphogluconolactonase from Trypanosoma brucei complexed with 6-phosphogluconic acid

6-Phosphogluconolactonase (EC 3.1.1.31, 6PGL, PGLS, systematic name 6-phospho-D-glucono-1,5-lactone lactonohydrolase) is a cytosolic enzyme found in all organisms that catalyzes the hydrolysis of 6-phosphogluconolactone to 6-phosphogluconic acid in the oxidative phase of the pentose phosphate pathway:

6-phospho-D-glucono-1,5-lactone + H_{2}O = 6-phospho-D-gluconate

The tertiary structure of 6PGL employs an α/β hydrolase fold, with active site residues clustered on the loops of the α-helices. Based on the crystal structure of the enzyme, the mechanism is proposed to be dependent on proton transfer by a histidine residue in the active site. 6PGL selectively catalyzes the hydrolysis of δ-6-phosphogluconolactone, and has no activity on the γ isomer.

== Enzyme Mechanism ==
6PGL hydrolysis of 6-phosphogluconolactone to 6-phosphogluconic acid has been proposed to proceed via proton transfer to the O5 ring oxygen atom, similar to xylose isomerase and ribose-5-phosphate isomerase. The reaction initiates via attack of a hydroxide ion at the C5 ester. A tetrahedral intermediate forms and elimination of the ester linkage follows, aided by donation of a proton from an active site histidine residue. The specific residue that participates in the proton transfer eluded researchers until 2009, as previous structural studies demonstrated two possible conformations of the substrate in the active site, which position the O5 ring oxygen proximal to either an arginine or a histidine residue. Molecular dynamic simulations were employed to discover that the residue that donates a proton is histidine, and that the arginine residues are only involved in electric stabilization of the negatively charged phosphate group. Electric stabilization of the enzyme-substrate complex also occurs between the product carboxylate and backbone amines of surrounding glycine residues.

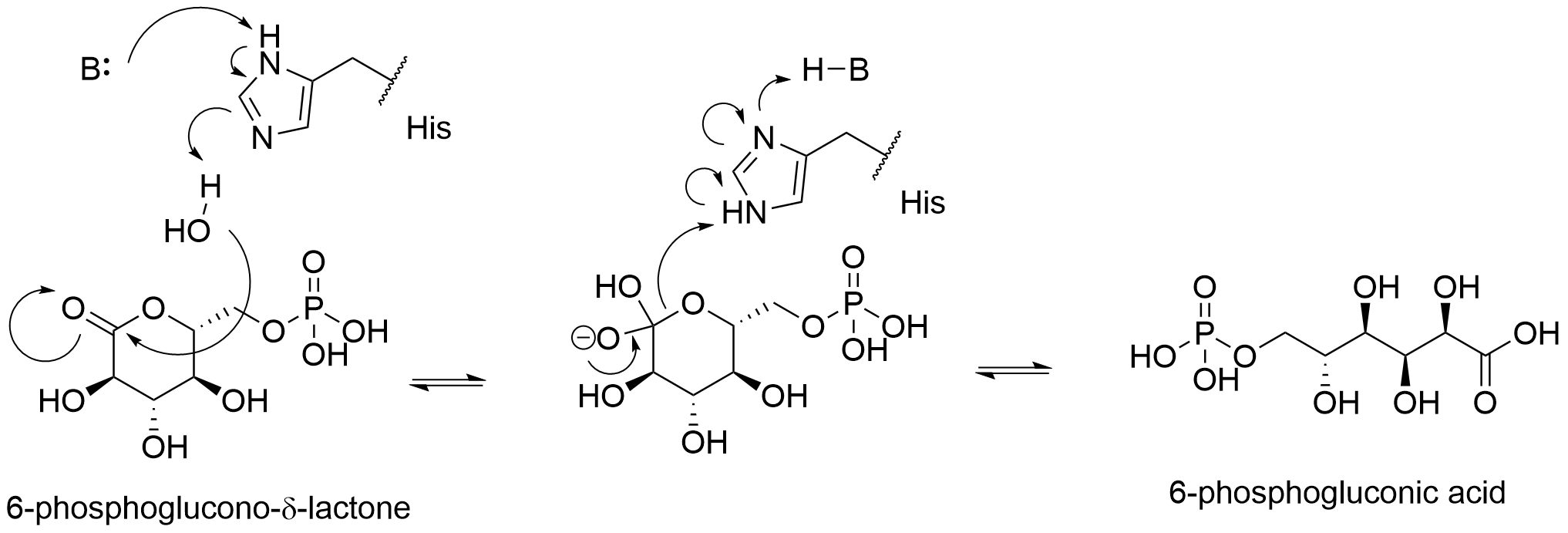
Proposed mechanism of 6-phosphogluconolactone hydrolysis by 6PGL.

== Enzyme Structure ==
6PGL in Homo sapiens exists as a monomer at cytosolic physiological conditions, and is composed of 258 amino acid residues with a total molecular mass of ~30 kDa. The tertiary structure of the enzyme utilizes an α/β hydrolase fold, with both parallel and anti-parallel β-sheets surrounded by eight α-helices and five 3_{10} helices. Stability of the tertiary structure of the protein is reinforced through salt bridges between aspartic acid and arginine residues, and from aromatic side-chain stacking interactions. 6PGL isolated from Trypanosoma brucei was found to bind with a Zn^{2+} ion in a non-catalytic role, but this has not been observed in other organisms, including Thermotoga maritima and Vibrio cholerae.

== Biological Function ==
6-phosphogluconolactonase catalyzes the conversion of 6-phosphogluconolactone to 6-phosphogluconic acid, both intermediates in the oxidative phase of the pentose phosphate pathway, in which glucose is converted into ribulose 5-phosphate. The oxidative phase of the pentose phosphate pathway releases CO_{2} and results in the generation of two equivalents of NADPH from NADP^{+}. The final product, ribulose 5-phosphate, is further processed by the organism during the non-oxidative phase of the pentose phosphate pathway to synthesize biomolecules including nucleotides, ATP, and Coenzyme A.

The enzyme that precedes 6PGL in the pentose phosphate pathway, glucose-6-phosphate dehydrogenase, exclusively forms the δ-isomer of 6-phosphogluconolactone. However, if accumulated, this compound can undergo intramolecular rearrangement to isomerize to the more stable γ-form, which is unable to be hydrolyzed by 6PGL and cannot continue to the non-oxidative phase of the pentose phosphate pathway. By quickly hydrolyzing the δ-isomer of 6-phosphogluconolactone, 6PGL prevents its accumulation and subsequent formation of the γ-isomer, which would be wasteful of the glucose resources available to the cell. 6-phosphogluconolactone is also susceptible to attack from intracellular nucleophiles, evidenced by α-N-6-phosphogluconoylation of His-tagged proteins expressed in E. coli, and efficient hydrolysis of 6-phosphogluconolactone by 6PGL prevents lactone accumulation and consequent toxic reactions from occurring between the lactone intermediate and the cell.

== Disease Relevance ==
Malarial parasites Plasmodium berghei and Plasmodium falciparum have been shown to express a bi-functional enzyme that exhibits both glucose-6-phosphate dehydrogenase and 6-phosphogluconolactonase activity, enabling it to catalyze the first two steps of the pentose phosphate pathway. This bifunctional enzyme has been identified as a druggable target for malarial parasites, and high-throughput screening of small molecule inhibitors has resulted in the discovery of novel compounds that can potentially be translated into potent antimalarials.
