= 6-Phosphogluconic acid =

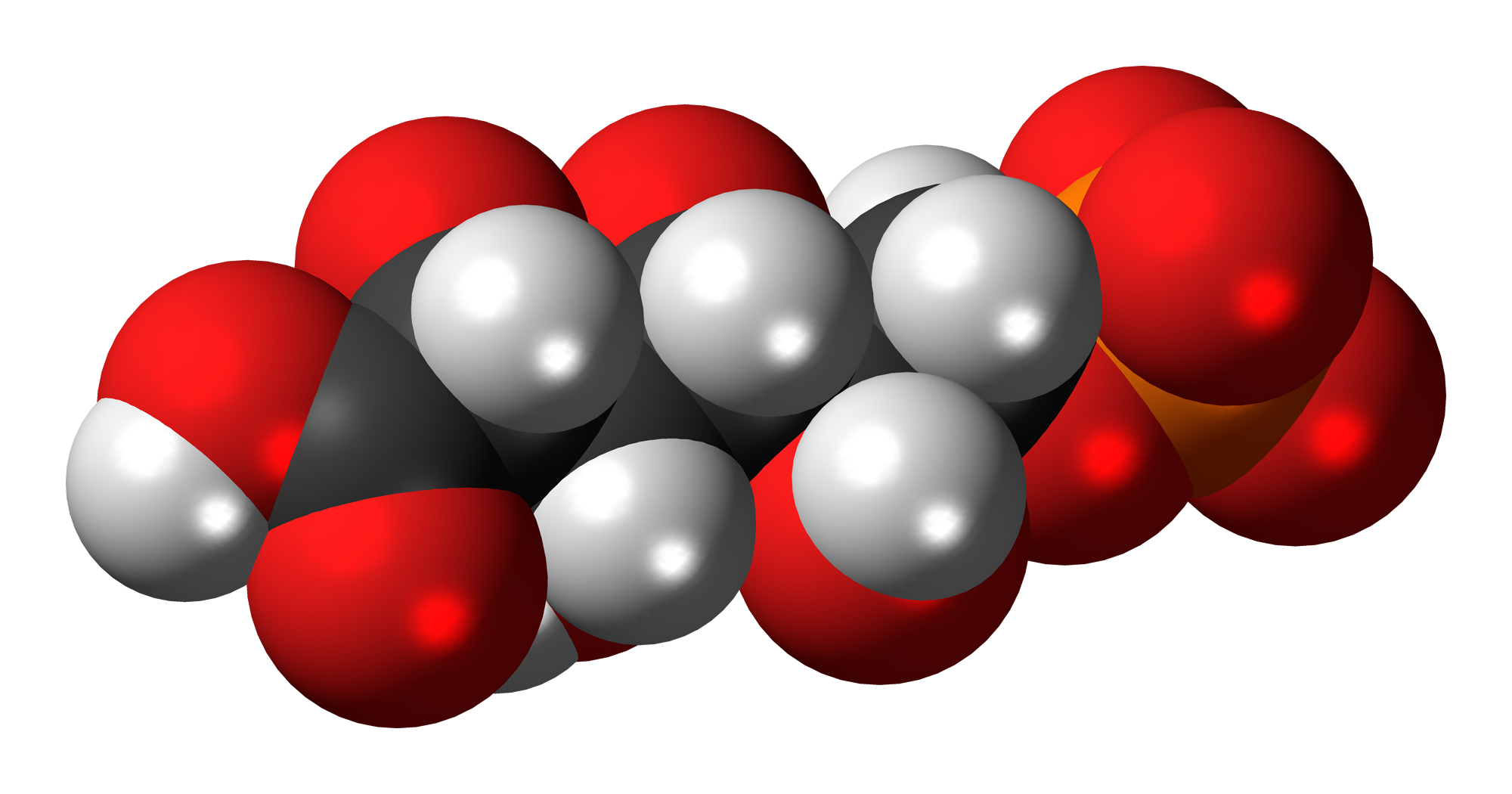

Names
- IUPAC name 6-O-Phosphono-D-gluconic acid
- Systematic IUPAC name (2R,3S,4R,5R)-2,3,4,5-Tetrahydroxy-6-(phosphonooxy)hexanoic acid
- Other names 6-Phosphogluconate

Identifiers
CAS Number	921-62-0
3D model (JSmol)	Interactive image
ChEBI	CHEBI:48928
ChemSpider	82615
ECHA InfoCard	100.011.882
KEGG	C00345
MeSH	6-phosphogluconate
PubChem CID	422
UNII	W31WK7B8U0
CompTox Dashboard (EPA)	DTXSID00872623
- InChI: InChI=1S/C6H13O10P/c7-2(1-16-17(13,14)15)3(8)4(9)5(10)6(11)12/h2-5,7-10H,1H2,(H,11,12)(H2,13,14,15)/t2-,3-,4+,5-/m1/s1 Key: BIRSGZKFKXLSJQ-SQOUGZDYSA-N; InChI=1/C6H13O10P/c7-2(1-16-17(13,14)15)3(8)4(9)5(10)6(11)12/h2-5,7-10H,1H2,(H,11,12)(H2,13,14,15)/t2-,3-,4+,5-/m1/s1 Key: BIRSGZKFKXLSJQ-SQOUGZDYBT
- SMILES: O=P(O)(O)OC[C@@H](O)[C@@H](O)[C@H](O)[C@@H](O)C(=O)O

Properties
Chemical formula	C_{6}H_{13}O_{10}P
Molar mass	276.134 g·mol^{−1}
- Except where otherwise noted, data are given for materials in their standard state (at 25 °C [77 °F], 100 kPa). verify (what is ?) Infobox references

6-Phosphogluconic acid (with conjugate base 6-phosphogluconate) is a phosphorylated sugar acid which appears in the pentose phosphate pathway and the Entner–Doudoroff pathway.

During the oxidative phase of the pentose phosphate pathway, it is formed from 6-phosphogluconolactone by 6-phosphogluconolactonase, and in turn, it is converted to ribulose 5-phosphate by phosphogluconate dehydrogenase, in an oxidative decarboxylation which also produces NADPH.

In those microorganisms which host the Entner-Doudoroff pathway, 6-phosphogluconic acid may also be acted upon by 6-phosphogluconate dehydratase to produce 2-keto-3-deoxy-6-phosphogluconate.

== See also ==
- Gluconic acid
