= 2-Dehydro-3-deoxy-phosphogluconate aldolase =

Class of enzymes

2-dehydro-3-deoxy-phosphogluconate aldolase
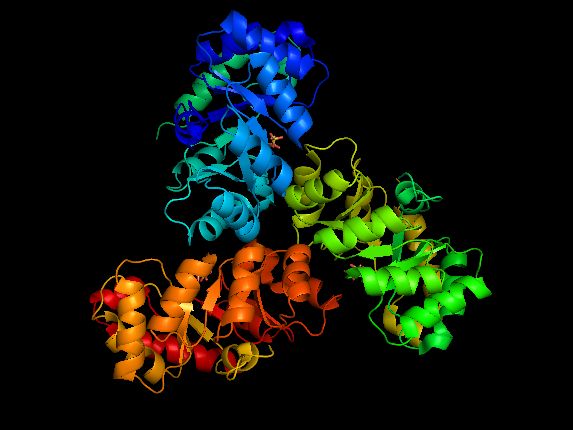

Identifiers
- EC no.: 4.1.2.14
- CAS no.: 9024-53-7

Databases
- IntEnz: IntEnz view
- BRENDA: BRENDA entry
- ExPASy: NiceZyme view
- KEGG: KEGG entry
- MetaCyc: metabolic pathway
- PRIAM: profile
- PDB structures: RCSB PDB PDBe PDBsum
- Gene Ontology: AmiGO / QuickGO
Search
- PMC: articles
- PubMed: articles
- NCBI: proteins

The enzyme 2-dehydro-3-deoxy-phosphogluconate aldolase (EC 4.1.2.14), commonly known as KDPG aldolase, catalyzes the chemical reaction

2-dehydro-3-deoxy-D-gluconate 6-phosphate $\rightleftharpoons$ pyruvate + D-glyceraldehyde 3-phosphate

This enzyme belongs to the family of lyases, specifically the aldehyde-lyases, which cleave carbon-carbon bonds. It is used in the Entner–Doudoroff pathway in prokaryotes, feeding into glycolysis. 2-dehydro-3-deoxy-phosphogluconate aldolase is one of the two enzymes distinguishing this pathway from the more commonly known Embden–Meyerhof–Parnas pathway. This enzyme also participates in following 3 metabolic pathways: pentose phosphate pathway, pentose and glucuronate interconversions, and arginine and proline metabolism.

In addition to the cleavage of 2-dehydro-3-deoxy-D-gluconate 6-phosphate, it is also found to naturally catalyze Schiff base formation between a lysine ε-amino acid group and carbonyl compounds, decarboxylation of oxaloacetate, and exchange of solvent protons with the methyl hydrogen atoms of pyruvate.

== Nomenclature ==
The systematic name of this enzyme class is 2-dehydro-3-deoxy-D-gluconate-6-phosphate D-glyceraldehyde-3-phosphate-lyase (pyruvate-forming). Other names in common use include:

- KDPG aldolase
- phospho-2-keto-3-deoxygluconate aldolase
- phospho-2-keto-3-deoxygluconic aldolase
- 2-keto-3-deoxy-6-phosphogluconic aldolase
- 2-keto-3-deoxy-6-phosphogluconate aldolase
- 6-phospho-2-keto-3-deoxygluconate aldolase
- ODPG aldolase, 2-oxo-3-deoxy-6-phosphogluconate aldolase
- 2-keto-3-deoxygluconate-6-P-aldolase
- 2-keto-3-deoxygluconate-6-phosphate aldolase
- 2-dehydro-3-deoxy-D-gluconate-6-phosphate
- D-glyceraldehyde-3-phosphate-lyase

== Enzyme structure ==
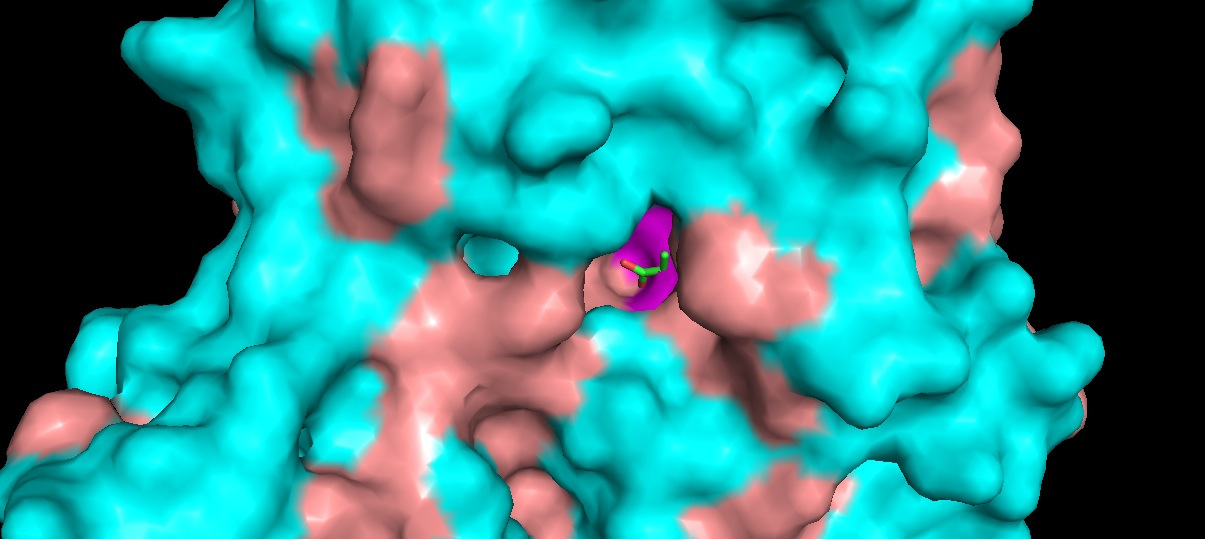
Active site structure with bound pyruvate (colors correspond to secondary structure, with cyan, magenta, and light pink referring to helices, sheets, and loops respectively)

KDPG Aldolase was recently determined to be a trimer through crystallographic three-fold symmetry, with 225 residues. The enzyme was determined to have a molecular weight of 23,942. The trimer is stabilized primarily through hydrophobic interactions. The molecule has tertiary folding similar to triosephosphate isomerase and the A-domain of pyruvate kinase, forming an eight strand α/β-barrel structure. The α/β-barrel structure is capped on one side by the N-terminal helix. The other side, the carboxylic side, contains the active site. Each subunit contains a phosphate-ion bound in position of the aldolase binding site. It has been found that there are four cysteinyl groups present in each subunit, with two readily accessible and two buried in the subunit.

The active site contains the zwitterionic pair Glu-45/Lys-133. The Lysine, which is involved in the formation of the Schiff base is coordinated by a phosphate ion and two solvent water molecules. The first water molecule serves as a shuttle between the Glutamate and the substrate, staying bound to the enzyme throughout the catalytic cycle. The second water molecule is a product of the dehydration of the carbinolamine that leads to the formation of the Schiff base. It also functions as the nucleophile during hydrolysis of the enzyme-product Schiff base, leading to the release of pyruvate.

As of late 2007, 13 structures have been solved for this class of enzymes, with PDB accession codes 1EUA, 1EUN, 1FQ0, 1FWR, 1KGA, 1MXS, 1WA3, 1WAU, 1WBH, 2C0A, 2NUW, 2NUX, and 2NUY.

== Enzyme mechanism ==
Active site showing interaction of pyruvate with zwitterionic pair Glu-45/Lys-133

One of the reactions KDPG Aldolase catalyzes, as in the Entner–Doudoroff pathway, is the reversible cleavage of 2-keto-3-deoxy-6-phosphogluconate (KDPG) into pyruvate and D-glyceraldehyde-3-phosphate. This occurs through a stereospecific retro-aldol cleavage. A proton transfer between the zwitterionic pair Glu-45/Lys-133 in the active site activates Lysine to serve as the nucleophile in the first step and Glutamate to aid in the base catalysis involved in the carbon-carbon cleavage. Lysine Residue 133 serves as the nucleophile and attacks the carbonyl group of 2-Keto-3-deoxy-6-phosphogluconate to form a protonated carbinolamine intermediate, also known as a Schiff base intermediate. The intermediate is stabilized by hydrogen bonding with residues in the active site. A three carbon residue, glyceraldehyde 3-phosphate, is cleaved off through base catalysis with a water molecule and residue Glu-45. The pyruvate is generated through the nucleophilic attack of water on the Schiff-base to reform a ketone. Aromatic interaction with Phe-135 ensures the stereospecific addition involved in the reverse process.

KDPG aldolase has also been shown to catalyze the exchange of hydrogen atoms of the methyl groups of pyruvate with protons of the solvent.

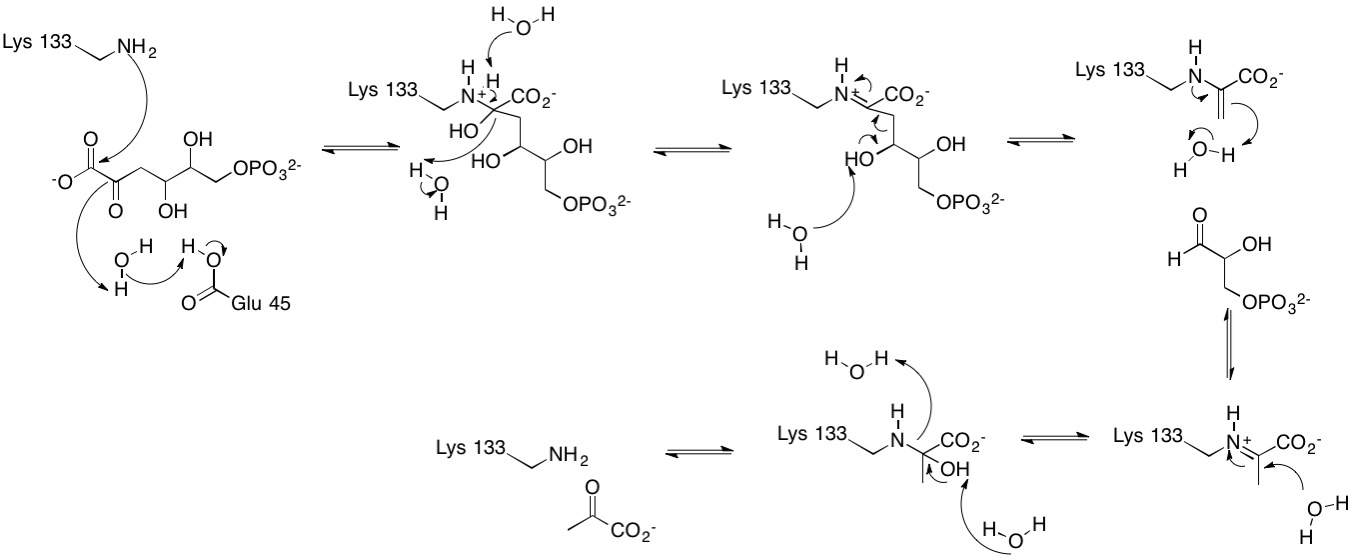
KDPG aldolase mechanism in the Entner–Doudoroff pathway

== Evolutionary significance ==
=== History ===
Arguments have been made for both the convergent and divergent evolution of α/β-barrel structured enzymes such as KDPG Aldolase, triosephosphate isomerase, and the A-domain of pyruvate kinase.

Convergent evolution can lead to geometrically similar active sites while each enzyme has a distinct backbone conformation. Convergence to a common backbone structure, as is the case here however, has not been observed, although it is argues that it might be possible for a symmetrically repetitive structure as the one observed here. The similarity in the folding of the three enzymes and the exceptional symmetry commonly suggests divergent evolution from a common ancestor. The functional similarity of the enzymes remains the strongest argument for divergent evolution. All three enzymes activate a C–H bond adjacent to a carbonyl group. The active sites are located at the carboxylic ends of the β strands. Such congruence is in favor of divergent evolution.

Should the divergent evolution hypothesis prevail, this would suggest the existence of a class of enzymes with unrelated amino acid sequences yet analogous symmetrical structure and folding.

Directed Evolution

KDPG aldolase has limited utility due to its high specificity for its natural substrates in the cleavage of KDPG and the reverse addition of D-glyceraldehyde-3-phosphate and pyruvate. In vitro evolution has allowed KDPG aldolase to be converted into a more efficient aldolase with altered substrate specificity and stereoselectivity thereby improving its utility in asymmetric synthesis. Rather than modifying the recognition site, the substrate is modified by moving the active site lysine from one β strand to a neighboring one. The evolved aldolase is capable of accepting both D- and L-glyceraldehyde in their non-phosphorylated form.
