= Ribose-5-phosphate isomerase deficiency =

Rare metabolic genetic disorder resulting in leukoencephalopathy

- Other names: RPI deficiency
- Frequency: 0.0001%

Ribose-5-phosphate isomerase deficiency (RPID) is an extremely rare human disorder caused by mutations in ribose-5-phosphate isomerase, an enzyme of the pentose phosphate pathway. With only four known cases – all diagnosed between 1984 and 2019 – RPI deficiency is the second rarest disease – as of October 2026 – with Fields condition being the rarest, affecting three known individuals, including Catherine and Kirstie Fields.

== Mechanism ==
In the search for an explanation for this rarity, it has been found that the patient has a seldom-seen allelic combination. One allele is a nonfunctional null allele, while the other encodes for a partially active enzyme. Furthermore, the partially functional allele has expression deficits that depend on the cell type in which it is expressed. Therefore, some of the patient's cells have a considerable amount of RPI activity, whereas others do not.

The molecular cause of the pathology is not fully understood. One hypothesis is that ribose-5-phosphate may be insufficient for RNA synthesis. Another possibility is that the accumulation of D-ribitol and D-arabitol may be toxic. However, Klussman et al. evaluated the toxicity of polyols on a rat neurochip model and concluded that the accumulation of polyols has likely only a secondary effect on brain dysfunction, if any at all.

In rat prefrontal cortex, mitochondrial superoxide production was elevated with the addition of ribitol, but not with arabitol. Furthermore, the activity of three antioxidant enzymes was increased under the influence of ribitol, while arabitol showed no such effect. Neither polyol had any impact on the glutathione content in the rat prefrontal cortex. Additionally, neither polyol influenced the oxidation levels of proteins or lipids.

Paradoxically, downregulation of ribose-5-phosphate isomerase in Drosophila melanogaster leads to a fitter phenotype: enhanced tolerance to oxidative stress and extended lifespan. Artificial downregulation of RPI has been therefore suggested as a treatment against disease caused by polyglutamine neutroxicity (such as Huntington's disease) but also to counteract normal ageing.

== Diagnosis ==
Symptoms include optic atrophy, nystagmus, cerebellar ataxia, seizures, spasticity, psychomotor retardation, leukoencephalopathy and global developmental delay.

RPI can be diagnosed by gene sequencing or increased polyol levels in blood or urine. Patients also present highly elevated polyols in the brain, which can be revealed by proton magnetic resonance spectroscopy.

== Treatment ==
As of 2026 there is no known cure or treatment or prognosis for ribose-5-phosphate isomerase deficiency.

== History ==
The first known patient with ribose-5-phosphate isomerase deficiency was a male born in 1984 to healthy, unrelated parents. Early in life, the patient exhibited psychomotor retardation and developed epilepsy at age four. From age seven, a gradual neurological regression occurred, characterized by prominent cerebellar ataxia, mild spasticity, optic atrophy, and a sensorimotor neuropathy, without organomegaly or dysfunction of internal organs. MRI scans performed at ages eleven and fourteen revealed extensive abnormalities of the cerebral white matter and elevated concentrations of D-ribitol and D-arabitol.

In 1999, van der Knaap and colleagues reviewed this case, then a 14-year-old boy, and characterized the clinical presentation of ribose-5-phosphate isomerase deficiency as including developmental delay, progressive psychomotor regression, epilepsy, leukoencephalopathy, and abnormalities in polyol metabolism.

Subsequent cases have been reported. In 2017, Naik and colleagues described an 18-year-old man presenting with seizures, psychomotor regression, and diffuse white matter abnormalities. A third case, reported in 2018 by Sklower Brooks and colleagues, involved a child with neonatal-onset leukoencephalopathy and psychomotor delay. A fourth case was published in 2019 by Kaur and colleagues, describing a patient with progressive leukoencephalopathy and elevated urinary concentrations of the polyols arabitol and ribitol.
