= NPED =

NPED may refer to:

- Non-primary explosive detonator
- Nuclear Power and Energy Division, a research organisation within the Bangladesh Atomic Energy Commission
- npED, nonphosphorylative ED, a variant of the Entner–Doudoroff pathway
