= Michael Doudoroff =

American microbiologist

- Born: 1911; St. Petersburg
- Died: 1975 (aged 63–64)
- Education: Stanford University
- Scientific career
- Fields: microbiology
- Doctoral advisor: Cornelis Van Niel

Michael Doudoroff (1911–1975) was an American microbiologist. With Nathan Entner, he discovered the Entner–Doudoroff pathway. He was born in St. Petersburg, Russian Empire but moved to San Francisco when he was 12 years old. He entered Stanford University (1929) where he completed his PhD under the supervision of Cornelis Van Niel at the Hopkins Marine Station.
