= 6-Phosphogluconate dehydrogenase =

Class of enzymes

6PGD
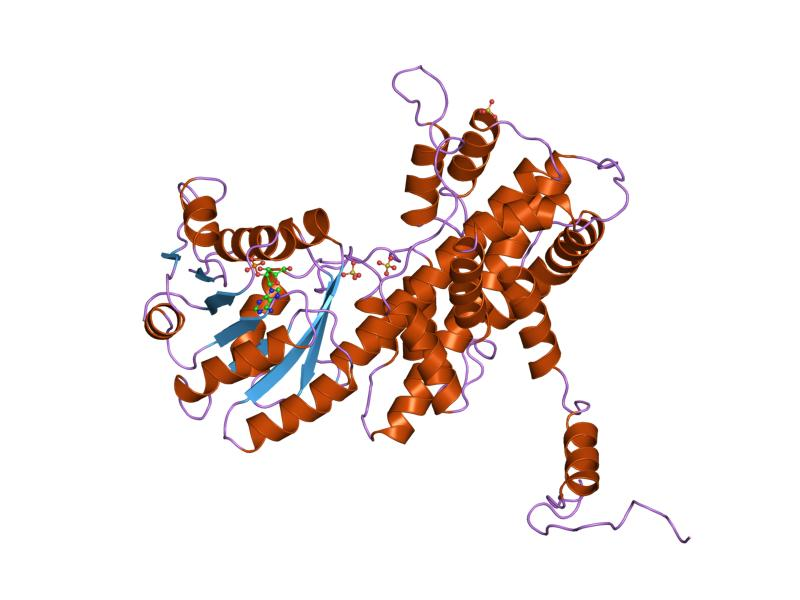
- Crystallographic structure of sheep 6-phosphogluconate dehydrogenase complexed with adenosine 2'-monophosphate

Identifiers
- Symbol: 6PGD
- Pfam: PF00393
- Pfam clan: CL0106
- InterPro: IPR006114
- PROSITE: PDOC00390
- SCOP2: 2pgd / SCOPe / SUPFAM
Available protein structures:
- PDB: IPR006114 PF00393 (ECOD; PDBsum)
- AlphaFold: IPR006114; PF00393

Phosphogluconate dehydrogenase
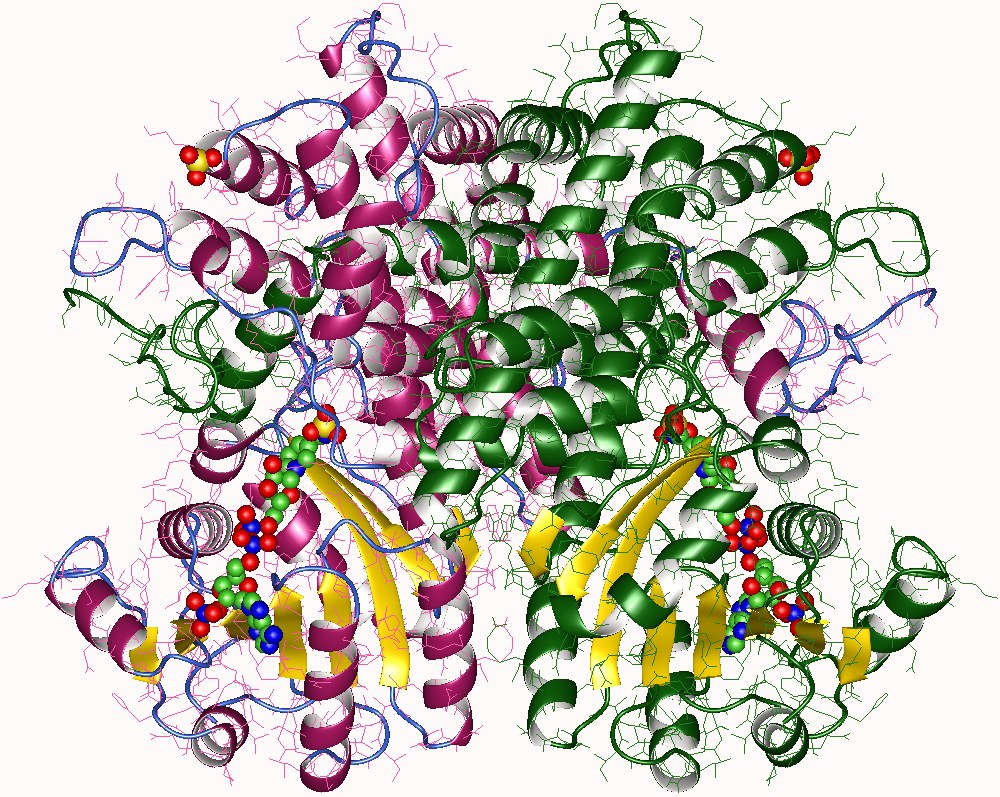
- 6-phosphogluconate dehydrogenase dimer, Ovis aries

Identifiers
- EC no.: 1.1.1.44
- CAS no.: 9001-82-5

Databases
- BRENDA: enzyme data
- ExPASy: NiceZyme view
- KEGG: enzyme entry
- MetaCyc: metabolic pathway
- Rhea: reactions
- PDB structures: RCSB PDB PDBe PDBsum
- Gene Ontology: AmiGO / QuickGO
Search
- PMC: articles
- PubMed: articles
- NCBI: proteins

phosphogluconate dehydrogenase

Identifiers
- Symbol: PGD
- NCBI gene: 5226
- HGNC: 8891
- OMIM: 172200
- RefSeq: NM_002631
- UniProt: P52209

Other data
- EC number: 1.1.1.44
- Locus: Chr. 1 p36.3-36.13
Search for
- Structures: Swiss-model
- Domains: InterPro

6-Phosphogluconate dehydrogenase (6PGD) is an enzyme in the pentose phosphate pathway. It forms ribulose 5-phosphate from 6-phosphogluconate:

6-Phosphogluconic acid
+ NAD^{+}
H^{+}
H^{+}
Ribulose 5-phosphate
+ CO_{2} + NADH

It is an oxidative carboxylase that catalyses the oxidative decarboxylation of 6-phosphogluconic acid into ribulose 5-phosphate in the presence of oxidised NAD^{+}. This reaction is a component of the hexose mono-phosphate shunt and pentose phosphate pathways (PPP). Prokaryotic and eukaryotic 6PGD are proteins of about 470 amino acids whose sequences are highly conserved. The protein is a homodimer in which the monomers act independently: each contains a large, mainly alpha-helical domain and a smaller beta-alpha-beta domain, containing a mixed parallel and anti-parallel 6-stranded beta sheet. NADP is bound in a cleft in the small domain, the substrate binding in an adjacent pocket.

== Biotechnological significance ==
Recently, 6PGD was demonstrated to catalyze also the reverse reaction (i.e. reductive carboxylation) in vivo. Experiments using Escherichia coli selection strains revealed that this reaction was efficient enough to support the formation of biomass based solely on CO_{2} and pentose sugars. In the future, this property could be exploited for synthetic carbon fixation routes.

== Clinical significance ==
Mutations within the gene coding this enzyme result in 6-phosphogluconate dehydrogenase deficiency, an autosomal hereditary disease affecting the red blood cells.

=== As a possible drug target ===
6PGD is involved in cancer cell metabolism so 6PGD inhibitors have been sought.

== See also ==
- Parietin, a 6PGD inhibitor
- Phosphogluconate dehydrogenase (decarboxylating) an enzyme that catalyses the same reaction but uses the cofactor NADP^{+}
