= Aldose-6-phosphate reductase (NADPH) =

aldose-6-phosphate reductase (NADPH)

Identifiers
- EC no.: 1.1.1.200
- CAS no.: 76901-04-7

Databases
- IntEnz: IntEnz view
- BRENDA: BRENDA entry
- ExPASy: NiceZyme view
- KEGG: KEGG entry
- MetaCyc: metabolic pathway
- PRIAM: profile
- PDB structures: RCSB PDB PDBe PDBsum
- Gene Ontology: AmiGO / QuickGO
Search
- PMC: articles
- PubMed: articles
- NCBI: proteins

In enzymology, aldose-6-phosphate reductase (NADPH) (EC 1.1.1.200) is an enzyme that catalyzes the chemical reaction

D-sorbitol 6-phosphate
+ NADP^{+}
H^{+}
H^{+}
D-glucose 6-phosphate
+ NADPH

The two substrates of this enzyme are D-sorbitol 6-phosphate and oxidised nicotinamide adenine dinucleotide phosphate (NADP^{+}). Its products are D-glucose 6-phosphate (shown in open-chain aldehydo form), reduced NADPH, and a proton.

This enzyme belongs to the family of oxidoreductases, specifically those acting on the CH-OH group of donor with NAD^{+} or NADP^{+} as acceptor. The systematic name of this enzyme class is D-aldose-6-phosphate:NADP^{+} 1-oxidoreductase. Other names in common use include aldose 6-phosphate reductase, NADP^{+}-dependent aldose 6-phosphate reductase, A6PR, aldose-6-P reductase, aldose-6-phosphate reductase, alditol 6-phosphate:NADP^{+} 1-oxidoreductase, and aldose-6-phosphate reductase (NADPH).
