= Gluconate dehydratase =

Class of enzymes

gluconate dehydratase

Identifiers
- EC no.: 4.2.1.39
- CAS no.: 37290-75-8

Databases
- IntEnz: IntEnz view
- BRENDA: BRENDA entry
- ExPASy: NiceZyme view
- KEGG: KEGG entry
- MetaCyc: metabolic pathway
- PRIAM: profile
- PDB structures: RCSB PDB PDBe PDBsum
- Gene Ontology: AmiGO / QuickGO
Search
- PMC: articles
- PubMed: articles
- NCBI: proteins

The enzyme gluconate dehydratase (EC 4.2.1.39) catalyzes the chemical reaction

D-gluconate $\rightleftharpoons$ 2-dehydro-3-deoxy-D-gluconate + H_{2}O

This enzyme belongs to the family of lyases, specifically the hydro-lyases, which cleave carbon-oxygen bonds. The systematic name of this enzyme class is D-gluconate hydro-lyase (2-dehydro-3-deoxy-D-gluconate-forming). Other names in common use include D-gluconate dehydratase, and D-gluconate hydro-lyase. This enzyme participates in the pentose phosphate pathway.

== Structural studies ==
As of late 2007, only one structure has been solved for this class of enzymes, with the PDB accession code 1QJ4.
