= 2-dehydro-3-deoxygluconokinase =

Class of enzymes

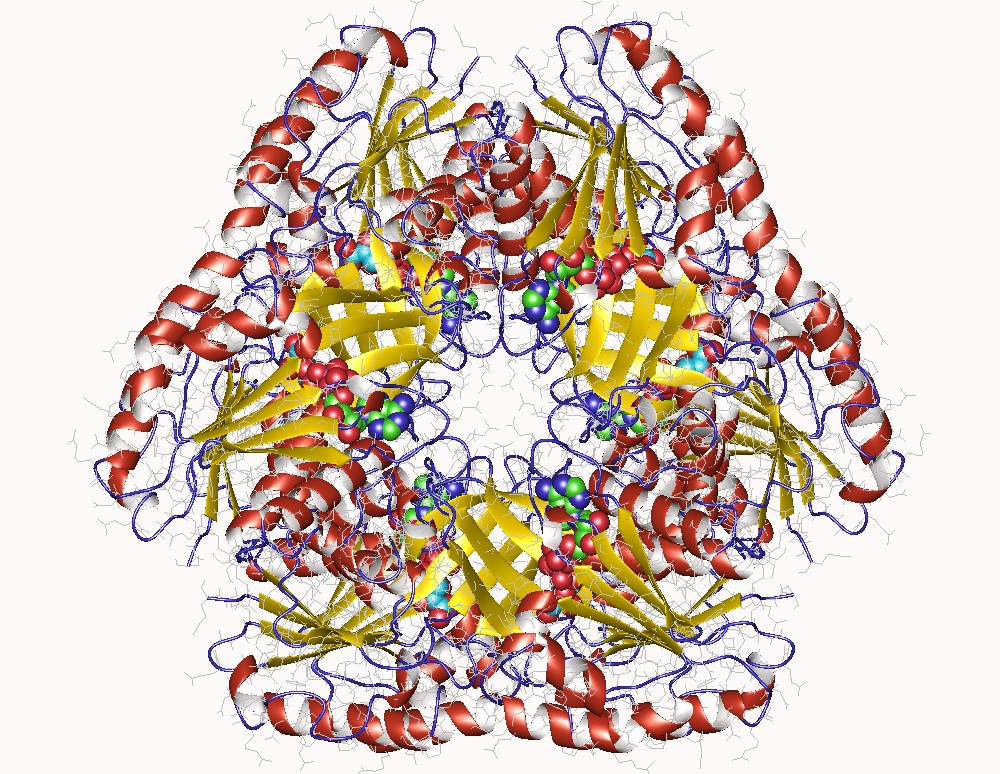
- 2-Keto-3-deoxygluconate kinase homohexamer, Thermus thermophilus

Identifiers
- EC no.: 2.7.1.45
- CAS no.: 9026-54-4

Databases
- IntEnz: IntEnz view
- BRENDA: BRENDA entry
- ExPASy: NiceZyme view
- KEGG: KEGG entry
- MetaCyc: metabolic pathway
- PRIAM: profile
- PDB structures: RCSB PDB PDBe PDBsum
- Gene Ontology: AmiGO / QuickGO
Search
- PMC: articles
- PubMed: articles
- NCBI: proteins

2-dehydro-3-deoxygluconokinase (EC 2.7.1.45) is an enzyme that catalyzes the chemical reaction

ATP +
2-dehydro-3-deoxy-D-gluconic acid
ADP +
2-dehydro-3-deoxy-6-phospho-D-gluconic acid

The enzyme characterised from Escherichia coli converts 2-dehydro-3-deoxy-D-gluconic acid to 2-dehydro-3-deoxy-6-phospho-D-gluconic acid by transferring a phosphate group from the cofactor, adenosine triphosphate (ATP), which is converted to adenosine diphosphate (ADP).

This enzyme is a transferase, specifically one transferring phosphorus-containing groups (phosphotransferases) with an alcohol group as acceptor. The systematic name of this enzyme class is ATP:2-dehydro-3-deoxy-D-gluconate 6-phosphotransferase. Other names in common use include 2-keto-3-deoxygluconokinase, 2-keto-3-deoxy-D-gluconic acid kinase, 2-keto-3-deoxygluconokinase (phosphorylating), 2-keto-3-deoxygluconate kinase, and ketodeoxygluconokinase. It participates in the pentose phosphate pathway.

== Structural studies ==
As of late 2007, only one structure has been solved for this class of enzymes, with the PDB accession code PDB: 1WYE.
