= Phosphoribokinase =

Identifiers
- EC no.: 2.7.1.18
- CAS no.: 9030-59-5

Databases
- IntEnz: IntEnz view
- BRENDA: BRENDA entry
- ExPASy: NiceZyme view
- KEGG: KEGG entry
- MetaCyc: metabolic pathway
- PRIAM: profile
- PDB structures: RCSB PDB PDBe PDBsum
- Gene Ontology: AmiGO / QuickGO
Search
- PMC: articles
- PubMed: articles
- NCBI: proteins

Phosphoribokinase (EC 2.7.1.18) is an enzyme that catalyzes the chemical reaction

ATP +
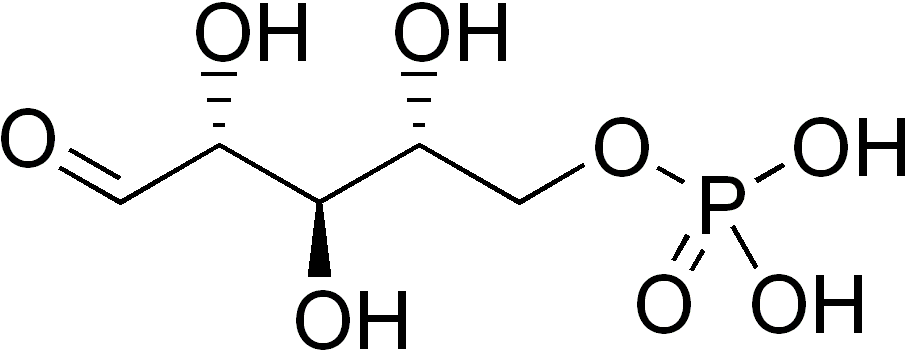
D-ribose 5-phosphate
ADP +
α-D-ribose 1,5-bisphosphate

The enzyme characterised from rabbit converts the pentose sugar, D-ribose 5-phosphate (shown in its open-chain aldehydo form), to α-D-ribose 1,5-bisphosphate by transferring a second phosphate group from the cofactor, adenosine triphosphate (ATP), which is converted to adenosine diphosphate (ADP).

This enzyme is a transferase, specifically one transferring phosphorus-containing groups (phosphotransferases) with an alcohol group as acceptor. The systematic name of this enzyme class is ATP:D-ribose-5-phosphate 1-phosphotransferase. This enzyme is also called phosphoribokinase (phosphorylating).
