= 6-Phosphogluconolactone =

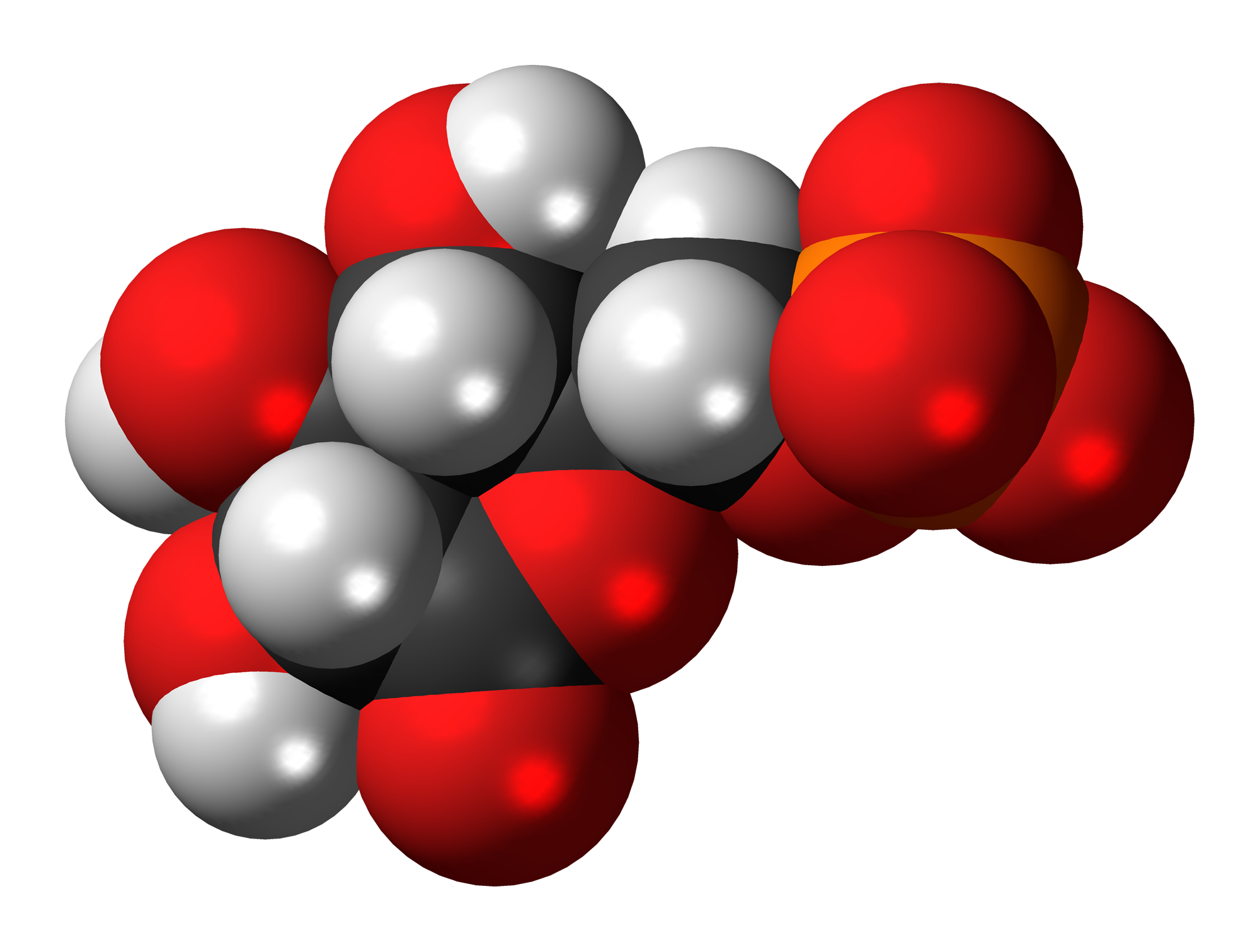

Names
- IUPAC name D-Glucono-1,5-lactone 6-(dihydrogen phosphate)
- Systematic IUPAC name [(2R,3S,4S,5R)-3,4,5-Trihydroxy-6-oxooxan-2-yl]methyl dihydrogen phosphate
- Other names 6-phospho-D-glucono-1,5-lactone; 6-phospho-D-glucono-δ-lactone; D-6-phosphoglucono-1,5-lactone; D-6-phosphoglucono-δ-lactone; D-glucono-1,5-lactone 6-phosphate D-glucono-δ-lactone 6-phosphate

Identifiers
| CAS Number | 2641-81-8 |
| 3D model (JSmol) | Interactive image |
| ChEBI | CHEBI:16938 |
| ChemSpider | 388559 |
| MeSH | 6-phosphogluconolactone |
| PubChem CID | 600 |
- InChI: InChI=1S/C6H11O9P/c7-3-2(1-14-16(11,12)13)15-6(10)5(9)4(3)8/h2-5,7-9H,1H2,(H2,11,12,13)/t2-,3-,4+,5-/m1/s1 Key: IJOJIVNDFQSGAB-SQOUGZDYSA-N; InChI=1/C6H11O9P/c7-3-2(1-14-16(11,12)13)15-6(10)5(9)4(3)8/h2-5,7-9H,1H2,(H2,11,12,13)/t2-,3-,4+,5-/m1/s1 Key: IJOJIVNDFQSGAB-SQOUGZDYBV
- SMILES: O=C1O[C@H](COP(=O)(O)O)[C@@H](O)[C@H](O)[C@H]1O

Properties
| Chemical formula | C_{6}H_{11}O_{9}P |
| Molar mass | 258.12 g/mol |
- Except where otherwise noted, data are given for materials in their standard state (at 25 °C [77 °F], 100 kPa). Infobox references

6-Phosphogluconolactone is an intermediate in the pentose phosphate pathway (PPP).

In the PPP, it is produced from glucose-6-phosphate by glucose-6-phosphate dehydrogenase.

Glucose 6-phosphonic acid
+ NADP^{+}
H^{+}
H^{+}
6-Phosphogluconolactone
+ NADPH

It is then converted to 6-Phosphogluconic acid by 6-phosphogluconolactonase.
