= Phosphogluconate dehydratase =

Enzyme

phosphogluconate dehydratase
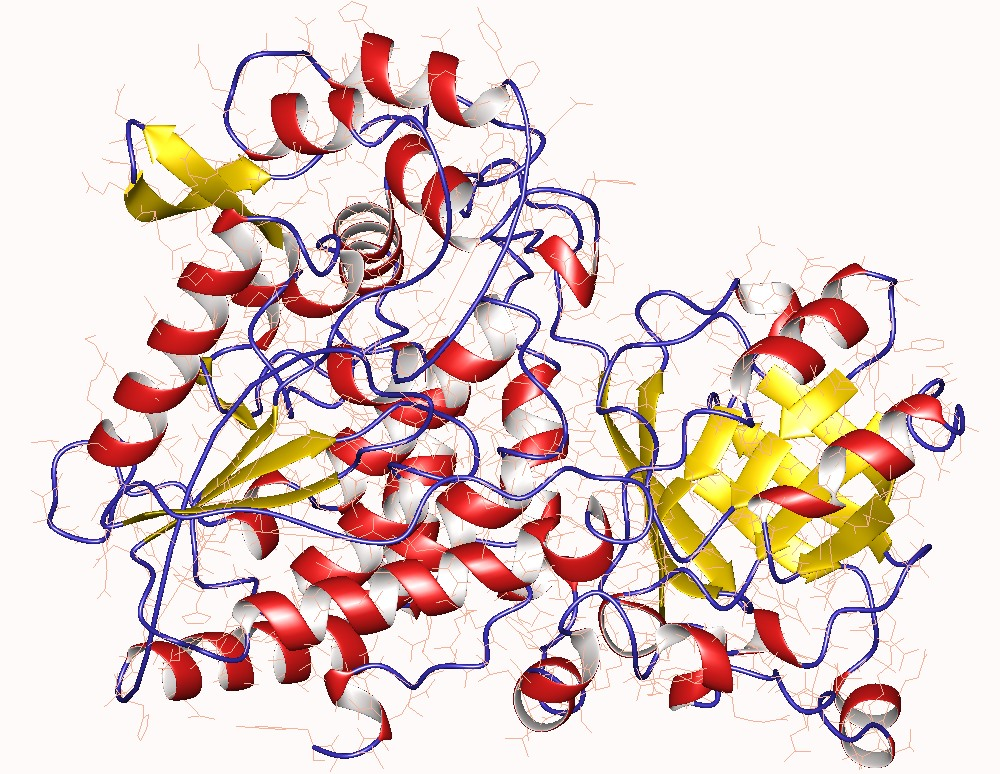
- 6-Phosphogluconate dehydratase monomer, Shewanella oneidensis

Identifiers
- EC no.: 4.2.1.12
- CAS no.: 9024-33-3

Databases
- IntEnz: IntEnz view
- BRENDA: BRENDA entry
- ExPASy: NiceZyme view
- KEGG: KEGG entry
- MetaCyc: metabolic pathway
- PRIAM: profile
- PDB structures: RCSB PDB PDBe PDBsum
- Gene Ontology: AmiGO / QuickGO
Search
- PMC: articles
- PubMed: articles
- NCBI: proteins

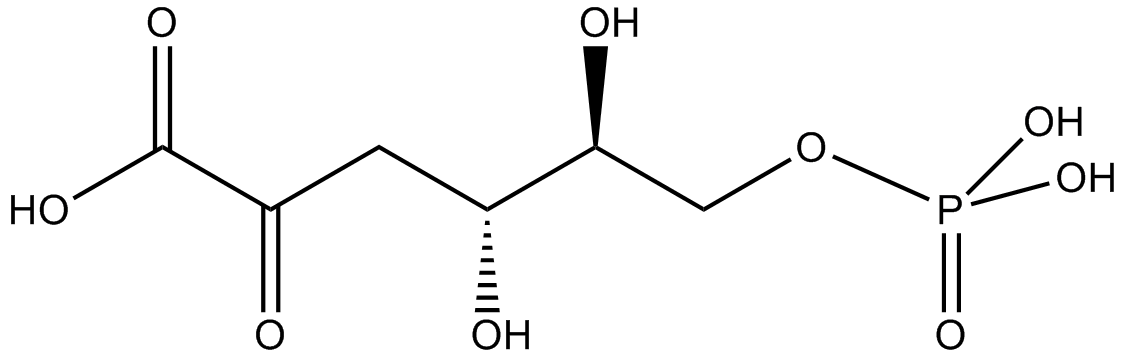
2-keto-3-deoxy-6-phosphogluconate, a product of the reaction catalysed by phosphogluconate dehydratase

The enzyme phosphogluconate dehydratase (EC 4.2.1.12) catalyzes the chemical reaction

6-phospho-D-gluconate $\rightleftharpoons$ 2-dehydro-3-deoxy-6-phospho-D-gluconate + H_{2}O

This enzyme belongs to the family of lyases, specifically the hydro-lyases, which cleave carbon-oxygen bonds. The systematic name of this enzyme class is 6-phospho-D-gluconate hydro-lyase (2-dehydro-3-deoxy-6-phospho-D-gluconate-forming). Other names in common use include 6-phosphogluconate dehydratase, 6-phosphogluconic dehydrase, gluconate-6-phosphate dehydratase, gluconate 6-phosphate dehydratase, 6-phosphogluconate dehydrase, and 6-phospho-Dgluconate hydro-lyase. This enzyme participates in the Entner–Doudoroff pathway.

== Structural studies ==
As of late 2007, only one structure has been solved for this class of enzymes, with the PDB accession code 2GP4.
