= Ribose-5-phosphate isomerase =

Enzyme that converts ribose-5-phosphate into ribulose-5-phosphate

ribose-5-phosphate isomerase
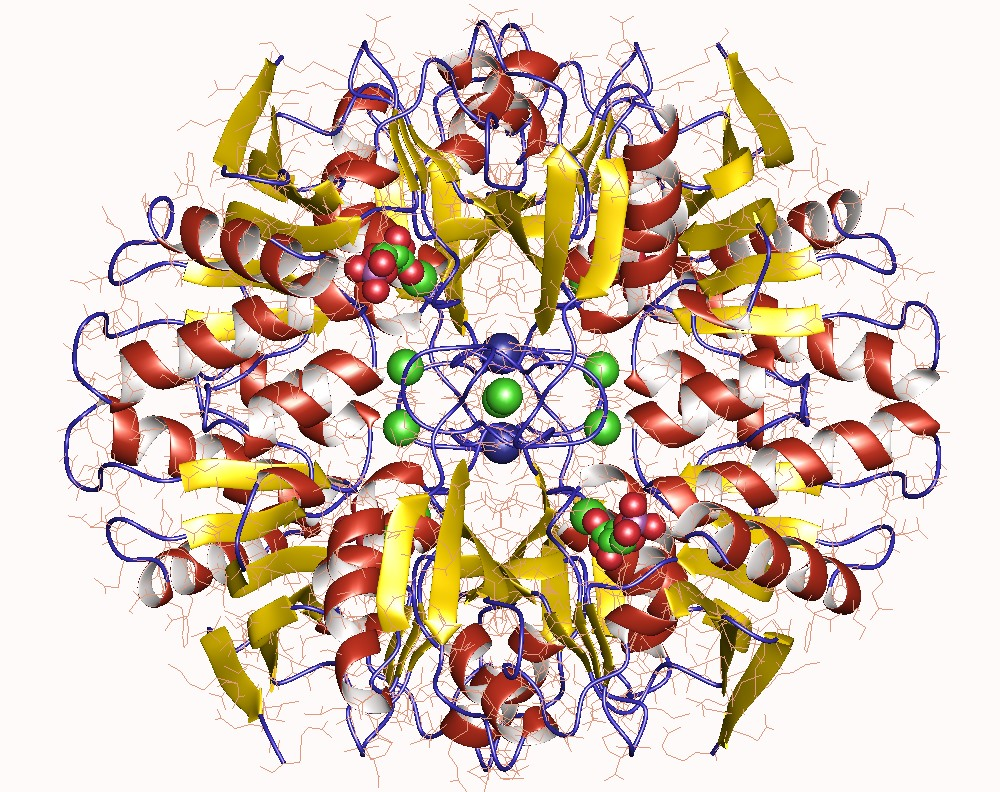
- D-Ribose-5-phosphate isomerase homotetramer, Pyrococcus horikoshii

Identifiers
- EC no.: 5.3.1.6
- CAS no.: 9023-83-0

Databases
- BRENDA: enzyme data
- ExPASy: NiceZyme view
- KEGG: enzyme entry
- MetaCyc: metabolic pathway
- Rhea: reactions
- PDB structures: RCSB PDB PDBe PDBsum
- Gene Ontology: AmiGO / QuickGO
Search
- PMC: articles
- PubMed: articles
- NCBI: proteins

RPIA

Identifiers
- Aliases: RPIA, RPI, RPIAD, ribose 5-phosphate isomerase A
- External IDs: OMIM: 180430; MGI: 103254; GeneCards: RPIA
Enzyme activity
EC #	BRENDA	ExPASy	KEGG	MetaCyc
5.3.1.6	↗	↗	↗	↗

Gene location (Human)
Chr.	Chromosome 2 (human)
Band	2p11.2	Start	88,691,673 bp
Band	2p11.2	End	88,750,929 bp

Gene location (Mouse)
Chr.	Chromosome 6 (mouse)
Band	6 C1|6 32.06 cM	Start	70,742,704 bp
Band	6 C1|6 32.06 cM	End	70,769,216 bp
RNA expression pattern
Bgee	Human / Mouse (ortholog); Top expressed in: secondary oocyte; bone marrow; trabecular bone; monocyte; mucosa of transverse colon; Skeletal muscle tissue of rectus abdominis; amniotic fluid; thymus; placenta; bone marrow cell / Top expressed in: gastrula; fetal liver hematopoietic progenitor cell; tibiofemoral joint; Ileal epithelium; Paneth cell; Gonadal ridge; zygote; spleen; migratory enteric neural crest cell; mesenteric lymph nodes; More reference expression data
BioGPS	n/a
Gene ontology
Molecular function	protein binding; isomerase activity; monosaccharide binding; carbohydrate binding; ribose-5-phosphate isomerase activity; identical protein binding
Cellular component	cytosol; intracellular membrane-bounded organelle
Biological process	pentose-phosphate shunt; ribose phosphate metabolic process; D-ribose metabolic process; pentose-phosphate shunt, non-oxidative branch
Sources:Amigo / QuickGO
Orthologs
Databases	NCBI: entry; OMA: entry
Species	Human	Mouse
Entrez	22934	19895
Ensembl	ENSG00000153574	ENSMUSG00000053604
UniProt	P49247	P47968
RefSeq (mRNA)	NM_144563	NM_009075
RefSeq (protein)	NP_653164	NP_033101
Location (UCSC)	Chr 2: 88.69 – 88.75 Mb	Chr 6: 70.74 – 70.77 Mb
PubMed search
- Wikidata
View/Edit Human	View/Edit Mouse

Ribose-5-phosphate isomerase (Rpi) is an enzyme (EC 5.3.1.6) that in humans is encoded by the gene RPIA. It catalyzes the conversion between ribose-5-phosphate (R5P) and ribulose-5-phosphate (Ru5P). It is a member of a larger class of isomerases which catalyze the interconversion of chemical isomers (in this case structural isomers of pentose). It plays a vital role in biochemical metabolism in both the pentose phosphate pathway and the Calvin cycle. The systematic name of this enzyme class is D-ribose-5-phosphate aldose-ketose-isomerase.

== Structure ==
=== Gene ===
RpiA in human beings is encoded on the second chromosome on the short arm (p arm) at position 11.2. Its encoding sequence is nearly 60,000 base pairs long. The only known naturally occurring genetic mutation results in ribose-5-phosphate isomerase deficiency, discussed below. The enzyme is thought to have been present for most of evolutionary history. Knock-out experiments conducted on the genes of various species meant to encode RpiA have indicated similar conserved residues and structural motifs, indicating ancient origins of the gene.

=== Protein ===
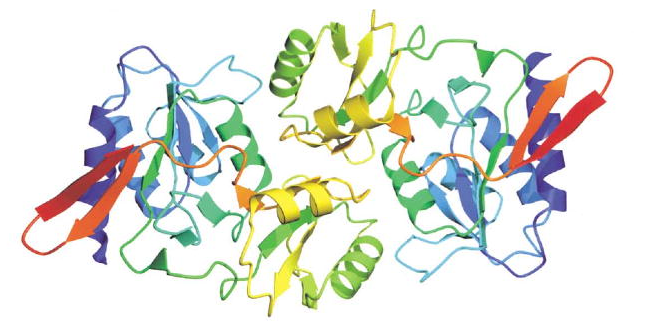
A structural diagram of the enzyme ribose-5-phosphate isomerase by Zhang, et al.

Rpi exists as two distinct proteins, termed RpiA and RpiB. Although RpiA and RpiB catalyze the same reaction, they show no sequence or overall structural homology. According to Jung et al., an assessment of RpiA using SDS-PAGE shows that the enzyme is a homodimer of 25 kDa subunits. The molecular mass of the RpiA dimer was found to be 49 kDa by gel filtration. Recently, the crystal structure of RpiA was determined. (please see)

Due to its role in the pentose phosphate pathway and the Calvin cycle, RpiA is highly conserved in most organisms, such as bacteria, plants, and animals. RpiA plays an essential role in the metabolism of plants and animals, as it is involved in the Calvin cycle which takes place in plants, and the pentose phosphate pathway which takes place in plants as well as animals.

All orthologs of the enzyme maintain an asymmetric tetramer quaternary structure with a cleft containing the active site. Each subunit consists of a five stranded β-sheet. These β-sheets are surrounded on both sides by α-helices. This αβα motif is not uncommon in other proteins, suggesting possible homology with other enzymes. The separate molecules of the enzyme are held together by highly polar contacts on the external surfaces of the monomers. It is presumed that the active site is located where multiple β-sheet C termini come together in the enzymatic cleft. This cleft is capable of closing upon recognition of the phosphate on the pentose (or an appropriate phosphate inhibitor). The active site is known to contain conserved residues equivalent to the E. coli residues Asp81, Asp84, and Lys94. These are directly involved in catalysis.

== Mechanism ==
In the reaction, the overall consequence is the movement of a carbonyl group from carbon number 1 to carbon number 2; this is achieved by the reaction going through an enediol intermediate (Figure 1). Through site-directed mutagenesis, Asp87 of spinach RpiA was suggested to play the role of a general base in the interconversion of R5P to Ru5P.

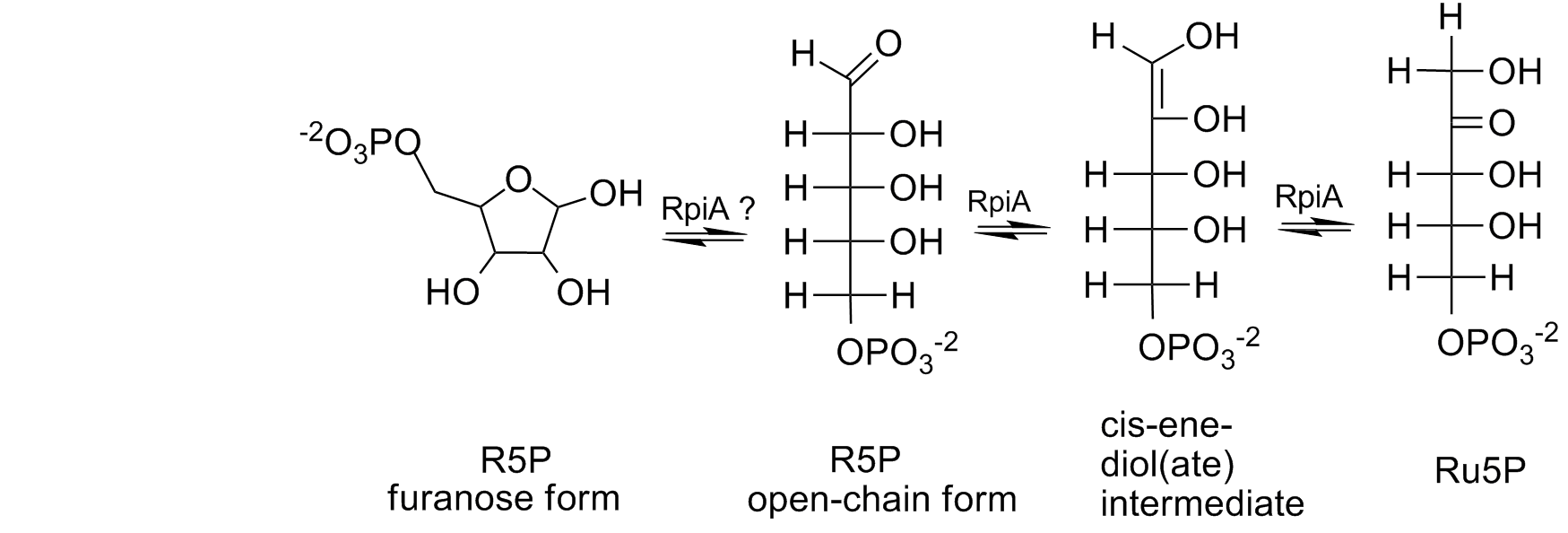

The first step in the catalysis is the docking of the pentose into the active site in the enzymatic cleft, followed by allosteric closing of the cleft. The enzyme is capable of bonding with the open-chain or ring form of the sugar-phosphate. If it does bind the furanose ring, it next opens the ring. Then the enzyme forms the eneldiol which is stabilized by a lysine or arginine residue. Calculations have demonstrated that this stabilization is the most significant contributor to the overall catalytic activity of this isomerase and a number of others like it.

== Function ==
The protein encoded by RPIA gene is an enzyme, which catalyzes the reversible conversion between ribose-5-phosphate and ribulose-5-phosphate in the pentose-phosphate pathway. This gene is highly conserved in most organisms. The enzyme plays an essential role in the carbohydrate metabolism. Mutations in this gene cause ribose 5-phosphate isomerase deficiency. A pseudogene is found on chromosome 18.

=== Pentose phosphate pathway ===
In the non-oxidative part of the pentose phosphate pathway, RPIA converts Ru5P to R5P which then is converted by ribulose-phosphate 3-epimerase to xylulose-5-phosphate (figure 3). The result of the reaction essentially is the conversion of the pentose phosphates to intermediates used in the glycolytic pathway. In the oxidative part of the pentose phosphate pathway, RpiA converts Ru5P to the final product, R5P through the isomerization reaction (figure 3). The oxidative branch of the pathway is a major source for NADPH which is needed for biosynthetic reactions and protection against reactive oxygen species.

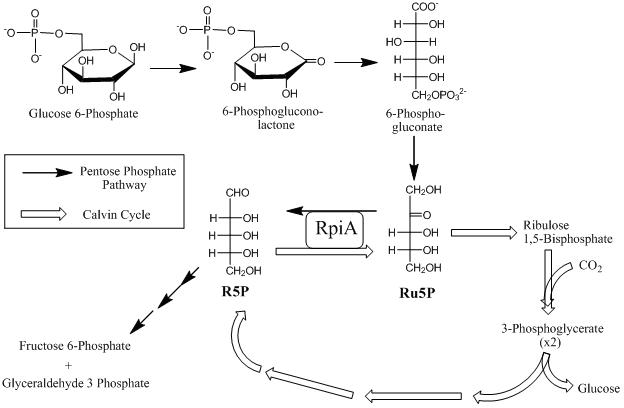

=== Calvin cycle ===
In the Calvin cycle, the energy from the electron carriers is used in carbon fixation, the conversion of carbon dioxide and water into carbohydrates. RPIA is essential in the cycle, as Ru5P generated from R5P is subsequently converted to ribulose-1,5-bisphosphate (RuBP), the acceptor of carbon dioxide in the first dark reaction of photosynthesis (Figure 3). The direct product of RuBP carboxylase reaction is glyceraldehyde-3-phosphate; these are subsequently used to make larger carbohydrates. Glyceraldehyde-3-phosphate is converted to glucose which is later converted by the plant to storage forms (e.g., starch or cellulose) or used for energy.

== Clinical significance ==
Ribose-5-phosphate isomerase deficiency is mutated in a rare disorder, Ribose-5-phosphate isomerase deficiency. The disease has only one known affected patient, diagnosed in 1999. It has been found to be caused by a combination of two mutations. The first is an insertion of a premature stop codon into the gene encoding the isomerase, and the second is a missense mutation. The molecular pathology is, as yet, unclear.

=== RpiA and hepatocarcinogenesis ===
Human ribose-5-phosphate isomerase A (RpiA) plays a role in human hepatocellular carcinoma (HCC). A significant increase in RpiA expression was detected both in tumor biopsies of HCC patients and in a liver cancer tissue array. Importantly, the clinicopathological analysis indicated that RpiA mRNA levels were highly correlated with clinical stage, grade, tumor size, types, invasion and alpha-fetoprotein levels in the HCC patients. In addition, the ability of RpiA to regulate cell proliferation and colony formation in different liver cancer cell lines required ERK signaling as well as the negative modulation of PP2A activity and that the effects of RpiA could be modulated by the addition of either a PP2A inhibitor or activator. It suggests that RpiA overexpression can induce oncogenesis in HCC.

=== RpiA and the malaria parasite ===
RpiA generated attention when the enzyme was found to play an essential role in the pathogenesis of the parasite Plasmodium falciparum, the causative agent of malaria. Plasmodium cells have a critical need for a large supply of the reducing power of NADPH via PPP in order to support their rapid growth. The need for NADPH is also required to detoxify heme, the product of hemoglobin degradation. Furthermore, Plasmodium has an intense requirement for nucleic acid production to support its rapid proliferation. The R5P produced via increased pentose phosphate pathway activity is used to generate 5-phospho-D-ribose α-1-pyrophosphate (PRPP) needed for nucleic acid synthesis. It has been shown that PRPP concentrations are increased 56 fold in infected erythrocytes compared with uninfected erythrocytes. Hence, designing drugs that target RpiA in Plasmodium falciparum could have therapeutic potential for patients that suffer from malaria.

== Interactions ==
RPIA has been shown to interact with PP2A.

== Structural studies ==
As of late 2007, 15 structures have been solved for this class of enzymes, with PDB accession codes PDB: 1LK5, PDB: 1LK7, PDB: 1LKZ, PDB: 1M0S, PDB: 1NN4, PDB: 1O1X, PDB: 1O8B, PDB: 1UJ4, PDB: 1UJ5, PDB: 1UJ6, PDB: 1USL, PDB: 1XTZ, PDB: 2BES, PDB: 2BET, and PDB: 2F8M.
