= Ribulose 5-phosphate =

Names
- IUPAC name: D-Ribulose 5-phosphate; 5-O-Phosphono-D-ribulose
- Systematic IUPAC name d-erythro-Pent-2-ulose 5-(dihydrogen phosphate)

Identifiers
CAS Number	551-85-9 D; 4151-19-3 D/L
3D model (JSmol)	Interactive image
Abbreviations	Ru5P
ChEBI	CHEBI:17363
ChemSpider	388327
DrugBank	DB04034
KEGG	C00199
MeSH	ribulose+5-phosphate
PubChem CID	439184
UNII	THU37VTP7Y
CompTox Dashboard (EPA)	DTXSID001336250
- InChI: InChI=1S/C5H11O8P/c6-1-3(7)5(9)4(8)2-13-14(10,11)12/h4-6,8-9H,1-2H2,(H2,10,11,12)/p-2/t4-,5+/m1/s1 Key: FNZLKVNUWIIPSJ-UHNVWZDZSA-L; InChI=1/C5H11O8P/c6-1-3(7)5(9)4(8)2-13-14(10,11)12/h4-6,8-9H,1-2H2,(H2,10,11,12)/p-2/t4-,5+/m1/s1 Key: FNZLKVNUWIIPSJ-DAZPBWGKBO
- SMILES: C([C@H]([C@H](C(=O)CO)O)O)OP(=O)(O)O

Properties
Chemical formula	C_{5}H_{11}O_{8}P
Molar mass	230.109 g·mol^{−1}
- Except where otherwise noted, data are given for materials in their standard state (at 25 °C [77 °F], 100 kPa). verify (what is ?) Infobox references

Ribulose 5-phosphate is one of the end-products of the pentose phosphate pathway. It is also an intermediate in the Calvin cycle.

It is formed by phosphogluconate dehydrogenase in the pentose phosphate pathway. Ribulose 5-phosphate is involved in various metabolic pathways. Ribulose 5-phosphate can be acted upon by phosphopentose isomerase to form ribose 5-phosphate, which is a precursor for nucleotide and co-factor biosynthesis. Ribulose-5 phosphate can also be acted upon by phosphopentose epimerase to form xylulose 5-phosphate, which is used in the nonoxidative phase of the pentose phosphate pathway in humans to generate precursor molecules for the synthesis of aromatic amino acids and production of energy.

In plants, ribulose 5-phosphate produced from the pentose-phosphate pathway is converted into ribulose-1,5-bisphosphate by the enzyme phosphoribokinase.

== See also ==
- Ribulose
- Ribulose-1,5-bisphosphate
