= Pentose phosphate pathway =

Series of interconnected biochemical reactions

The pentose phosphate pathway

The pentose phosphate pathway (also called the phosphogluconate pathway, the hexose monophosphate shunt and abbreviated as PPP) is a metabolic pathway parallel to glycolysis. It generates NADPH and pentoses (five-carbon sugars) as well as ribose 5-phosphate, a precursor for the synthesis of nucleotides. While the pentose phosphate pathway does involve oxidation of glucose, its primary role is anabolic rather than catabolic. The pathway is especially important in red blood cells (erythrocytes). The reactions of the pathway were elucidated in the early 1950s by Bernard Horecker and co-workers.

There are two distinct phases in the pathway. The first is the oxidative phase, in which NADPH is generated, and the second is the non-oxidative synthesis phase, which involves the synthesis of five-carbon sugars. For most organisms, the pentose phosphate pathway takes place in the cytosol; in plants, most steps take place in plastids.

Like glycolysis, the pentose phosphate pathway appears to have a very ancient evolutionary origin. The reactions of this pathway are mostly enzyme-catalyzed in modern cells; however, they also occur non-enzymatically under conditions that replicate those of the Archean ocean, and are catalyzed by metal ions, particularly ferrous ions (Fe(II)). This suggests that the origins of the pathway could date back to the prebiotic world.

== Outcome ==
The primary results of the pathway are:

- The generation of reducing equivalents, in the form of NADPH, used in reductive biosynthesis reactions within cells (e.g. fatty acid synthesis).
- Production of ribose 5-phosphate (R5P), used in the synthesis of nucleotides and nucleic acids.
- Production of erythrose 4-phosphate (E4P), used in the synthesis of aromatic amino acids in non-mammals.

Aromatic amino acids, in turn, are precursors for many complex biomolecules, including lignin in wood.

Dietary pentose sugars derived from the digestion of nucleic acids may be metabolized through the pentose phosphate pathway, and the carbon skeletons of dietary carbohydrates may be converted into glycolytic/gluconeogenic intermediates.

The oxidative PPP is particularly important in the liver, lactatingmammary glands, and adipose tissue for fatty acids synthesis, and in steroid-producing tissues (including the adrenal cortex for steroid hormone synthesis). The PPP is one of the three main ways the body creates molecules with reducing power, accounting for approximately 60% of NADPH production in humans.

One of the uses of NADPH in the cell is to prevent oxidative stress. It reduces glutathione via glutathione reductase, which converts reactive H_{2}O_{2} into H_{2}O by glutathione peroxidase. Without NADPH, the H_{2}O_{2} would be converted to hydroxyl free radicals by Fenton chemistry, which can attack the cell. Erythrocytes, for example, generate a large amount of NADPH through the pentose phosphate pathway to use in the reduction of glutathione.

Hydrogen peroxide is also generated by phagocytes in a process often referred to as a respiratory burst.

== Phases ==
=== Oxidative phase ===
In this phase, two molecules of NADP^{+} are reduced to NADPH, utilizing the energy from the conversion of glucose-6-phosphate into ribulose 5-phosphate.

Oxidative phase of pentose phosphate pathway. Glucose-6-phosphate (1), 6-phosphoglucono-δ-lactone (2), 6-phosphogluconate (3), ribulose 5-phosphate (4)

The entire set of reactions can be summarized as follows:

Reactants	Products	Enzyme	Description
Glucose 6-phosphate + NADP+	→ 6-phosphoglucono-δ-lactone + NADPH	glucose 6-phosphate dehydrogenase	Dehydrogenation. The hydroxyl on carbon 1 of glucose 6-phosphate turns into a carbonyl, generating a lactone, and, in the process, NADPH is generated.
6-phosphoglucono-δ-lactone + H_{2}O	→ 6-phosphogluconate + H^{+}	6-phosphogluconolactonase	Hydrolysis
6-phosphogluconate + NADP^{+}	→ ribulose 5-phosphate + NADPH + CO_{2}	6-phosphogluconate dehydrogenase	Oxidative decarboxylation. NADP^{+} is the electron acceptor, generating another molecule of NADPH, a CO_{2}, and ribulose 5-phosphate.

The overall reaction for this process is:

Glucose 6-phosphate + 2 NADP^{+} + H_{2}O → ribulose 5-phosphate + 2 NADPH + 2 H^{+} + CO_{2}

=== Non-oxidative phase ===
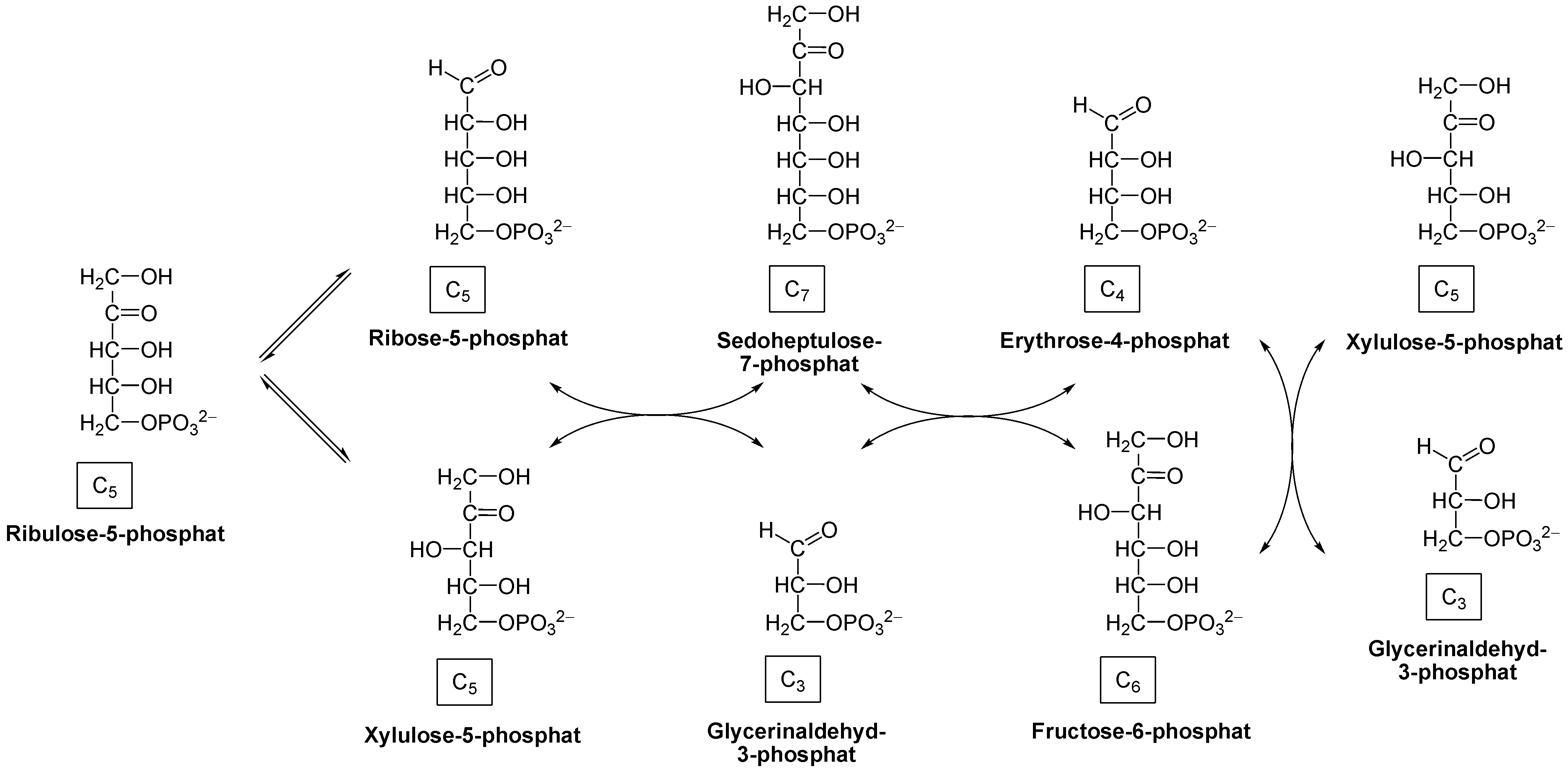
The pentose phosphate pathway's nonoxidative phase

Reactants	Products	Enzymes
ribulose 5-phosphate	→ ribose 5-phosphate	ribose-5-phosphate isomerase
ribulose 5-phosphate	→ xylulose 5-phosphate	ribulose 5-phosphate 3-epimerase
xylulose 5-phosphate + ribose 5-phosphate	→ glyceraldehyde 3-phosphate + sedoheptulose 7-phosphate	transketolase
sedoheptulose 7-phosphate + glyceraldehyde 3-phosphate	→ erythrose 4-phosphate + fructose 6-phosphate	transaldolase
xylulose 5-phosphate + erythrose 4-phosphate	→ glyceraldehyde 3-phosphate + fructose 6-phosphate	transketolase

Net reaction: 3 ribulose-5-phosphate → 1 ribose-5-phosphate + 2 xylulose-5-phosphate → 2 fructose-6-phosphate + glyceraldehyde-3-phosphate

=== Regulation ===
Glucose-6-phosphate dehydrogenase is the rate-controlling enzyme of this pathway. It is allosterically stimulated by NADP^{+} and strongly inhibited by NADPH. The ratio of NADPH:NADP^{+} is the primary mode of regulation for the enzyme and is normally about 100:1 in liver cytosol. This makes the cytosol a highly-reducing environment. An NADPH-utilizing pathway forms NADP^{+}, which stimulates Glucose-6-phosphate dehydrogenase to produce more NADPH.

G6PD activity is also post-translationally regulated by cytoplasmic deacetylase SIRT2. SIRT2-mediated deacetylation and activation of G6PD stimulates oxidative branch of PPP to supply cytosolic NADPH to counteract oxidative damage or support de novo lipogenesis.

== Erythrocytes ==
Several deficiencies in the level of activity (not function) of glucose-6-phosphate dehydrogenase have been observed to be associated with resistance to the malarial parasite Plasmodium falciparum among individuals of Mediterranean and African descent. The basis for this resistance may be a weakening of the red cell membrane (the erythrocyte is the host cell for the parasite) such that it cannot sustain the parasitic life cycle long enough for productive growth.

== See also ==
- G6PD deficiency – A hereditary disease that disrupts the pentose phosphate pathway
- RNA
- Thiamine deficiency
- Frank Dickens FRS
