= Glycerol-3-phosphate dehydrogenase (disambiguation) =

Glycerol-3-phosphate dehydrogenase may refer to:

- Glycerol-3-phosphate dehydrogenase, an enzyme (EC 1.1.1.8) with systematic name sn-glycerol-3-phosphate:NAD+ 2-oxidoreductase
- Glycerol-3-phosphate dehydrogenase (NAD(P)+), an enzyme (EC 1.1.1.94) with systematic name sn-glycerol-3-phosphate:NAD(P)^{+} 2-oxidoreductase
- Glycerol-3-phosphate dehydrogenase (quinone), an enzyme (EC 1.1.5.3) with systematic name sn-glycerol 3-phosphate:quinone oxidoreductase
- Glycerol-3-phosphate dehydrogenase 1
- Glycerol-3-phosphate dehydrogenase (NAD+)
- Glycerol-3-phosphate 1-dehydrogenase (NADP+)
