= Glycerol phosphate shuttle =

NADH transport mechanism in mitochondria

Glycerol Phosphate Shuttle

The glycerol-3-phosphate shuttle is a mechanism used in skeletal muscle and the brain that regenerates NAD^{+} from NADH, a by-product of glycolysis. NADH is a reducing equivalent that stores electrons generated in the cytoplasm during glycolysis. NADH must be transported into the mitochondria to enter the oxidative phosphorylation pathway. However, the inner mitochondrial membrane is impermeable to NADH and only contains a transport system for NAD^{+}. Depending on the type of tissue either the glycerol-3-phosphate shuttle pathway or the malate–aspartate shuttle pathway is used to transport electrons from cytoplasmic NADH into the mitochondria.

The shuttle consists of two proteins acting in sequence. Cytoplasmic glycerol-3-phosphate dehydrogenase (cGPD) transfers an electron pair from NADH to dihydroxyacetone phosphate (DHAP), forming glycerol-3-phosphate (G3P) and regenerating the NAD^{+} needed to generate energy via glycolysis. Mitochondrial glycerol-3-phosphate dehydrogenase (mGPD) then catalyzes the oxidation of G3P by FAD, regenerating DHAP in the cytosol and forming FADH_{2} in the mitochondrial matrix. In mammals, its activity in transporting reducing equivalents across the mitochondrial membrane is secondary to the malate–aspartate shuttle.

== History ==
The glycerol phosphate shuttle was first characterized as a major route of mitochondrial hydride transport in the flight muscles of blow flies. It was initially believed that the system would be inactive in mammals due to the predominance of lactate dehydrogenase activity over glycerol-3-phosphate dehydrogenase 1 (GPD1) until high GPD1 and GPD2 activity were demonstrated in mammalian brown adipose tissue and pancreatic ß-cells.

== Reaction ==
In this shuttle, the enzyme called cytoplasmic glycerol-3-phosphate dehydrogenase 1 (GPD1 or cGPD) converts dihydroxyacetone phosphate (2) to glycerol 3-phosphate (1) by oxidizing one molecule of NADH to NAD^{+} as in the following reaction:

Glycerol-3-phosphate is converted back to dihydroxyacetone phosphate by an inner membrane-bound mitochondrial glycerol-3-phosphate dehydrogenase 2 (GPD2 or mGPD), this time reducing one molecule of enzyme-bound flavin adenine dinucleotide (FAD) to FADH_{2}. FADH_{2} then reduces coenzyme Q (ubiquinone to ubiquinol) whose electrons enter into oxidative phosphorylation. This reaction is irreversible. These electrons bypass Complex I of the electron transport chain, making the glycerol-3-phosphate shuttle less energetically efficient compared to oxidation of NADH by Complex I.

== See also ==
- Malate-aspartate shuttle
- Mitochondrial shuttle
