= Mitochondrial shuttle =

Biochemical transport system

The mitochondrial shuttles are biochemical transport systems used to transport reducing agents across the inner mitochondrial membrane. NADH as well as NAD+ cannot cross the membrane, but it can reduce another molecule like FAD and [QH_{2}] that can cross the membrane, so that its electrons can reach the electron transport chain.

The two main systems in humans are the glycerol phosphate shuttle and the malate-aspartate shuttle. The malate/α-ketoglutarate antiporter functions move electrons while the aspartate/glutamate antiporter moves amino groups. This allows the mitochondria to receive the substrates that it needs for its functionality in an efficient manner.

== Shuttles ==
In humans, the glycerol phosphate shuttle is primarily found in brown adipose tissue, as the conversion is less efficient, thus generating heat, which is one of the main purposes of brown fat. It is primarily found in babies, though it is present in small amounts in adults around the kidneys and on the back of our necks. The malate-aspartate shuttle is found in much of the rest of the body.

Name	In To mitochondrion	To ETC	Out To cytosol
Glycerol phosphate shuttle	Glycerol 3-phosphate	QH_{2} (~1.5 ATP)	Dihydroxyacetone phosphate
Malate-aspartate shuttle	Malate	NADH (~2.5 ATP)	Oxaloacetate/aspartate

The shuttles contains a system of mechanisms used to transport metabolites that lack a protein transporter in the membrane, such as oxaloacetate.

=== Malate shuttle ===
The malate shuttle allows the mitochondria to move electrons from NADH without the consumption of metabolites and it uses two antiporters to transport metabolites and keep balance within the mitochondrial matrix and cytoplasm.

On the cytoplasmic side a transaminase enzyme is used to remove an amino group from aspartate which is converted into oxaloacetate, then malate dehydrogenase enzyme uses an NADH cofactor to reduce oxaloacetate to malate which can be transported across the membrane because of the presence of a transporter.

Once the malate is inside the matrix its converted back to oxaloacetate, which is converted to aspartate and can be transported back outside the mitochondria to allow the cycle to continue. The movement of oxaloacetate across the membrane transports electrons and is known as the outer ring. The inner ring primary function is not to move electrons but regenerate the metabolites.

=== Glycerol phosphate shuttle ===
The transamination of oxaloacetate to aspartate is achieved through the use of glutamate. Glutamate is transported with aspartate via antiporter, thus as one aspartate leaves the cell, a glutamate enters. Glutamate in the matrix is converted into an a-ketoglutarate which is transported in an antiporter with malate. In the cytoplasmic side a-ketoglutarate is converted back into glutamate when aspartate is converted back to oxaloacetate.

== Use against cancer ==
Most cancer cells cause mutation in the bodies' metabolic activities to increase glucose metabolism in order to rapidly proliferate. Mutations that increase the cells metabolic activity and turn a normal cell into a tumor cell are called oncogenes. Cancer cells are unlike many other cells. They have very little vulnerabilities, but experiments in which the inhibition of transamination of malate-shuttle slowed proliferation due to the fact metabolism of glucose was being slowed.

== See also ==
- Mitochondrial carrier
