= Glycerol 2-dehydrogenase (NADP+) =

Class of enzymes

glycerol 2-dehydrogenase (NADP^{+})

Identifiers
- EC no.: 1.1.1.156
- CAS no.: 39342-20-6

Databases
- IntEnz: IntEnz view
- BRENDA: BRENDA entry
- ExPASy: NiceZyme view
- KEGG: KEGG entry
- MetaCyc: metabolic pathway
- PRIAM: profile
- PDB structures: RCSB PDB PDBe PDBsum
- Gene Ontology: AmiGO / QuickGO
Search
- PMC: articles
- PubMed: articles
- NCBI: proteins

In enzymology, a glycerol 2-dehydrogenase (NADP^{+}) (EC 1.1.1.156) is an enzyme that catalyzes the chemical reaction

glycerol
+ NADP^{+}
H^{+}
H^{+}
glycerone
+ NADPH

The two substrates of this enzyme are glycerol and oxidised nicotinamide adenine dinucleotide phosphate (NADP^{+}). Its products are glycerone, reduced NADPH, and a proton.

This enzyme belongs to the family of oxidoreductases, specifically those acting on the CH-OH group of donor with NAD^{+} or NADP^{+} as acceptor. The systematic name of this enzyme class is glycerol:NADP^{+} 2-oxidoreductase (glycerone-forming). Other names in common use include dihydroxyacetone reductase, dihydroxyacetone (reduced nicotinamide adenine dinucleotide, phosphate) reductase, dihydroxyacetone reductase (NADPH), DHA oxidoreductase, and glycerol 2-dehydrogenase (NADP^{+}). This enzyme participates in glycerolipid metabolism.

== See also ==
- Glycerol dehydrogenase
