= Phosphoenolpyruvate—glycerone phosphotransferase =

Enzyme

Phosphoenolpyruvate-glycerone phosphotransferase

Identifiers
- EC no.: 2.7.1.121
- CAS no.: 91755-81-6

Databases
- IntEnz: IntEnz view
- BRENDA: BRENDA entry
- ExPASy: NiceZyme view
- KEGG: KEGG entry
- MetaCyc: metabolic pathway
- PRIAM: profile
- PDB structures: RCSB PDB PDBe PDBsum
- Gene Ontology: AmiGO / QuickGO
Search
- PMC: articles
- PubMed: articles
- NCBI: proteins

Phosphoenolpyruvate-glycerone phosphotransferase (EC 2.7.1.121) is an enzyme that catalyzes a chemical reaction between phosphoenolpyruvic acid and dihydroxyacetone (a.k.a. glycerone) which converts them to pyruvic acid and dihydroxyacetone phosphate after transfer of a phosphate group.

phosphoenolpyruvic acid
+
dihydroxyacetone
pyruvic acid
+
dihydroxyacetone phosphate

The enzyme was characterised from Escherichia coli.

This enzyme is a transferase, specifically one transferring phosphorus-containing groups (phosphotransferases) with an alcohol group as acceptor. The systematic name of this enzyme class is phosphoenolpyruvate:glycerone phosphotransferase.
