= Glycerol-3-phosphate—glucose phosphotransferase =

Class of enzymes

Glycerol-3-phosphate-glucose phosphotransferase

Identifiers
- EC no.: 2.7.1.142
- CAS no.: 125008-33-5

Databases
- IntEnz: IntEnz view
- BRENDA: BRENDA entry
- ExPASy: NiceZyme view
- KEGG: KEGG entry
- MetaCyc: metabolic pathway
- PRIAM: profile
- PDB structures: RCSB PDB PDBe PDBsum
- Gene Ontology: AmiGO / QuickGO
Search
- PMC: articles
- PubMed: articles
- NCBI: proteins

Glycerol-3-phosphate-glucose phosphotransferase (EC 2.7.1.142) is an enzyme that catalyzes a chemical reaction that transfers a phosphate group from sn-glycerol 3-phosphate to D-glucose, giving glycerol and glucose 6-phosphate:

glycerol 3-phosphate
+
D-glucose
glycerol
+
glucose 6-phosphate

The enzyme was characterised from Trypanosoma brucei brucei.

This enzyme is a transferase, specifically one transferring phosphorus-containing groups (phosphotransferases) with an alcohol group as acceptor. The systematic name of this enzyme class is sn-glycerol-3-phosphate:D-glucose 6-phosphotransferase.
