= Sn-glycerol-1-phosphate dehydrogenase =

Class of enzymes

sn-glycerol-1-phosphate dehydrogenase

Identifiers
- EC no.: 1.1.1.261
- CAS no.: 204594-18-3

Databases
- IntEnz: IntEnz view
- BRENDA: BRENDA entry
- ExPASy: NiceZyme view
- KEGG: KEGG entry
- MetaCyc: metabolic pathway
- PRIAM: profile
- PDB structures: RCSB PDB PDBe PDBsum
- Gene Ontology: AmiGO / QuickGO
Search
- PMC: articles
- PubMed: articles
- NCBI: proteins

In enzymology, sn-glycerol-1-phosphate dehydrogenase (EC 1.1.1.261) is an enzyme that catalyzes the chemical reaction

(S)-glyceryl 1-phosphate
+ NAD^{+}
H^{+}
H^{+}
glycerone phosphate
+ NADH

The two substrates of this enzyme are (S)-glyceryl 1-phosphate and oxidised nicotinamide adenine dinucleotide (NAD^{+}). Its products are glycerone phosphate, reduced NADH, and a proton. The enzyme can also use the alternative cofactor, nicotinamide adenine dinucleotide phosphate.

This enzyme belongs to the family of oxidoreductases, specifically those acting on the CH-OH group of donor with NAD^{+} or NADP^{+} as acceptor. The systematic name of this enzyme class is sn-glycerol-1-phosphate:NAD(P)^{+} 2-oxidoreductase. This enzyme is also called glycerol-1-phosphate dehydrogenase [NAD(P)^{+}].

G-1-P dehydrogenase is responsible for the formation of sn-glycerol 1-phosphate, the backbone of the membrane phospholipids of Archaea. The gene encoding glycerol-1-phosphate dehydrogenase has been detected in all the archaeal species and has not been found in any bacterial or eukaryal species. sn-glycerol 1-phosphate produced by this enzyme is the most fundamental difference by which Archaea and bacteria are discriminated.

The enzyme sn-glycerol-1-phosphate dehydrogenase, usually having 394 amino acids, was also identified in bacteria. More than 5700 sequences have been published in GenBank (September 2023) in a different bacteria, including such well-known ones as Bacillus subtilis (GenBank: AOR99168.1).

== See also ==
- Glycerol-3-phosphate dehydrogenase (NAD+) which acts on the enantiomer of sn-glycerol-1-phosphate
