= Glycerol-3-phosphate cytidylyltransferase =

Class of enzymes

Identifiers
- EC no.: 2.7.7.39
- CAS no.: 9027-11-6

Databases
- IntEnz: IntEnz view
- BRENDA: BRENDA entry
- ExPASy: NiceZyme view
- KEGG: KEGG entry
- MetaCyc: metabolic pathway
- PRIAM: profile
- PDB structures: RCSB PDB PDBe PDBsum
- Gene Ontology: AmiGO / QuickGO
Search
- PMC: articles
- PubMed: articles
- NCBI: proteins

Glycerol-3-phosphate cytidylyltransferase (EC 2.7.7.39) is an enzyme that catalyzes the reversible chemical reaction

(R)-glycerol 1-phosphate
+
cytidine triphosphate
PP_{i}
PP_{i}
(2R)-CDP-glycerol

The enzyme characterised from Lactobacillus arabinosus and Bacillus subtilis combines cytidine triphosphate and (R)-glycerol 1-phosphate to give (2R)-CDP-glycerol, with pyrophosphate (PP_{i}) as a byproduct. The mechanism of reaction in Staphylococcus aureus has been studied and is a part of the biosynthesis of teichoic acid.

This enzyme is a transferase, specifically one transferring phosphorus-containing nucleotide groups (nucleotidyltransferases). The systematic name of this enzyme class is CTP:sn-glycerol-3-phosphate cytidylyltransferase. Other names in common use include CDP-glycerol pyrophosphorylase, cytidine diphosphoglycerol pyrophosphorylase, cytidine diphosphate glycerol pyrophosphorylase, CTP:glycerol 3-phosphate cytidylyltransferase, and Gro-PCT.

== Structural studies ==
As of late 2007, 3 structures have been solved for this class of enzymes, with PDB accession codes PDB: 1COZ, PDB: 1N1D, and PDB: 2B7L.
