= C3H7O6P =

The molecular formula C_{3}H_{7}O_{6}P may refer to:

- Dihydroxyacetone phosphate, anion with the formula HOCH_{2}C(O)CH_{2}OPO_{3}^{2-}
- Glyceraldehyde 3-phosphate, anion with the formula H(O)CCH(OH)CH_{2}OPO_{3}^{^{2-}}
