= Glycerol-3-phosphate dehydrogenase (NAD+) =

Enzyme that catalyzes chemical reaction

Glycerol-3-phosphate dehydrogenase (NAD^{+})
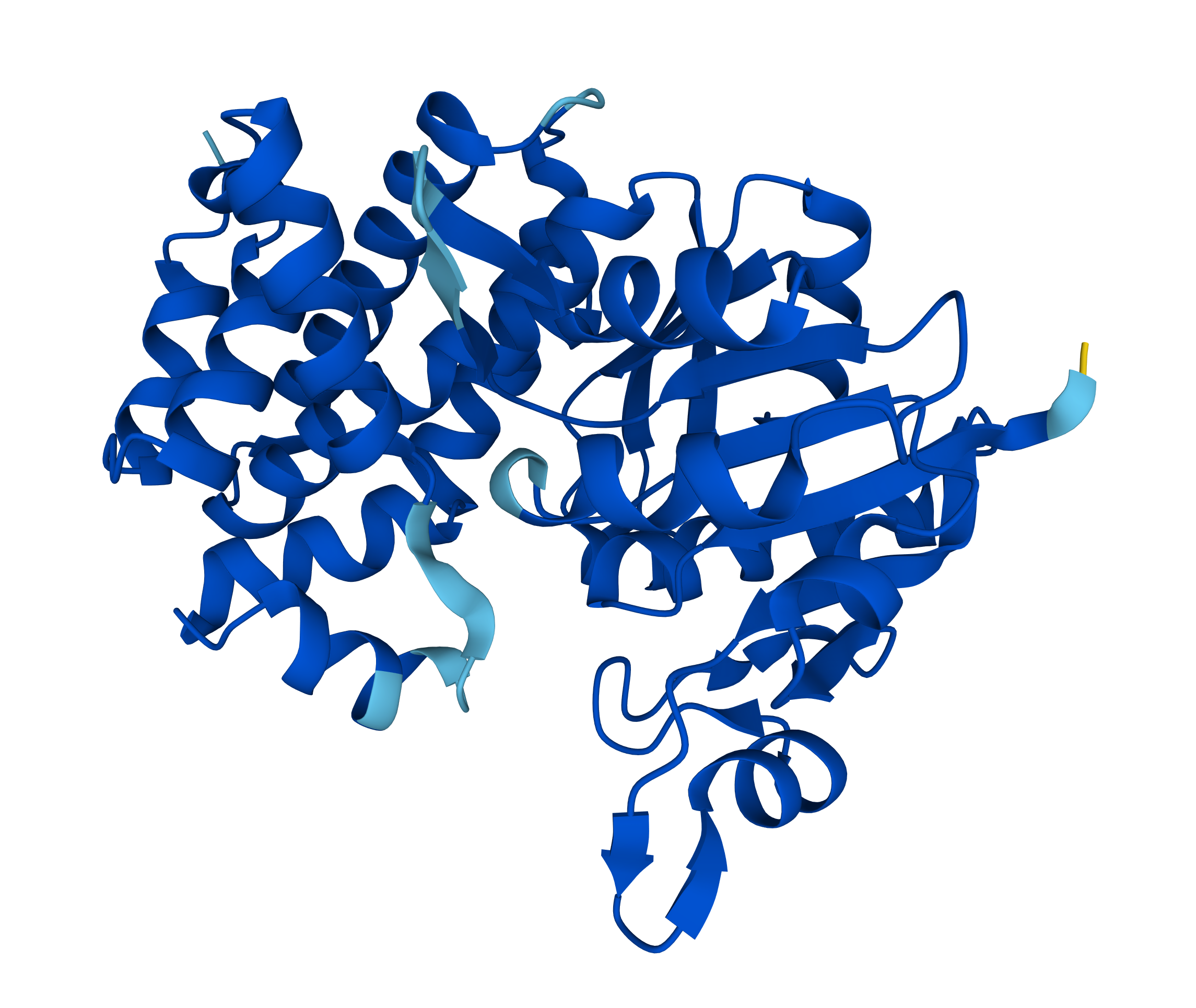

Identifiers
- EC no.: 1.1.1.8
- CAS no.: 9075-65-4

Databases
- BRENDA: enzyme data
- ExPASy: NiceZyme view
- KEGG: enzyme entry
- MetaCyc: metabolic pathway
- Rhea: reactions
- PDB structures: RCSB PDB PDBe PDBsum
- Gene Ontology: AmiGO / QuickGO
Search
- PMC: articles
- PubMed: articles
- NCBI: proteins

A glycerol-3-phosphate dehydrogenase (NAD^{+}) (EC 1.1.1.8) is a type of enzyme that in humans is encoded by the genes GPD1 and GPD1L, and catalyzes the chemical reaction

sn glycerol 3-phosphate
+ NAD^{+}
H^{+}
H^{+}
dihydroxyacetone phosphate
+ NADH

The two substrates of this enzyme are sn-glycerol 3-phosphate and oxidised nicotinamide adenine dinucleotide (NAD^{+}). Its products are dihydroxyacetone phosphate, the reduced cofactor NADH, and a proton.

This enzyme belongs to the family of oxidoreductases, specifically those acting on the CH-OH group of donor with NAD^{+} or NADP^{+} as acceptor. The systematic name of this enzyme class is sn-glycerol-3-phosphate:NAD^{+} 2-oxidoreductase. Other names in common use include alpha-glycerol phosphate dehydrogenase (NAD^{+}), alpha-glycerophosphate dehydrogenase (NAD^{+}), glycerol 1-phosphate dehydrogenase, glycerol phosphate dehydrogenase (NAD^{+}), glycerophosphate dehydrogenase (NAD^{+}), hydroglycerophosphate dehydrogenase, L-alpha-glycerol phosphate dehydrogenase, L-alpha-glycerophosphate dehydrogenase, L-glycerol phosphate dehydrogenase, L-glycerophosphate dehydrogenase, NAD^{+}-alpha-glycerophosphate dehydrogenase, NAD^{+}-dependent glycerol phosphate dehydrogenase, NAD^{+}-dependent glycerol-3-phosphate dehydrogenase, NAD^{+}-L-glycerol-3-phosphate dehydrogenase, NAD^{+}-linked glycerol 3-phosphate dehydrogenase, NADH-dihydroxyacetone phosphate reductase, and glycerol-3-phosphate dehydrogenase (NAD^{+}). This enzyme participates in glycerophospholipid metabolism.

== Structural studies ==
As of late 2007, 12 structures have been solved for this class of enzymes, with PDB accession codes PDB: 1EVY, PDB: 1EVZ, PDB: 1JDJ, PDB: 1M66, PDB: 1M67, PDB: 1N1E, PDB: 1N1G, PDB: 1WPQ, PDB: 1X0V, PDB: 1X0X, PDB: 1YJ8, and PDB: 1Z82.

== See also ==
- sn-glycerol-1-phosphate dehydrogenase which acts on the enantiomer of sn glycerol 3-phosphate
