= Glycerol-3-phosphate dehydrogenase (NAD(P)+) =

Enzyme group

glycerol-3-phosphate dehydrogenase [NAD(P)^{+}]

Identifiers
- EC no.: 1.1.1.94
- CAS no.: 37250-30-9

Databases
- IntEnz: IntEnz view
- BRENDA: BRENDA entry
- ExPASy: NiceZyme view
- KEGG: KEGG entry
- MetaCyc: metabolic pathway
- PRIAM: profile
- PDB structures: RCSB PDB PDBe PDBsum
- Gene Ontology: AmiGO / QuickGO
Search
- PMC: articles
- PubMed: articles
- NCBI: proteins

In enzymology, glycerol-3-phosphate dehydrogenase [NAD(P)^{+}] (EC 1.1.1.94) is an enzyme that catalyzes the chemical reaction

L-α-glycerophosphoric acid
+ NAD^{+}
H^{+}
H^{+}
dihydroxyacetonephosphoric acid
+ NADH

The two substrates of this enzyme are L-α-glycerophosphoric acid, and oxidised nicotinamide adenine dinucleotide (NAD^{+}). Its products are dihydroxyacetonephosphoric acid, reduced NADH, and a proton. The enzyme can also use the alternative cofactor, nicotinamide adenine dinucleotide phosphate.

This enzyme belongs to the family of oxidoreductases, specifically those acting on the CH-OH group of donor with NAD^{+} or NADP^{+} as acceptor. The systematic name of this enzyme class is sn-glycerol-3-phosphate:NAD(P)^{+} 2-oxidoreductase. Other names in common use include L-glycerol-3-phosphate:NAD(P)^{+} oxidoreductase, glycerol phosphate dehydrogenase (nicotinamide adenine dinucleotide, (phosphate)), glycerol 3-phosphate dehydrogenase (NADP^{+}), and glycerol-3-phosphate dehydrogenase [NAD(P)^{+}]. This enzyme participates in glycerophospholipid metabolism.

== Structural studies ==
As of late 2007, only one structure has been solved for this class of enzymes, with the PDB accession code 1TXG.
