= Diphosphate—glycerol phosphotransferase =

Class of enzymes

Diphosphate-glycerol phosphotransferase

Identifiers
- EC no.: 2.7.1.79
- CAS no.: 37278-13-0

Databases
- IntEnz: IntEnz view
- BRENDA: BRENDA entry
- ExPASy: NiceZyme view
- KEGG: KEGG entry
- MetaCyc: metabolic pathway
- PRIAM: profile
- PDB structures: RCSB PDB PDBe PDBsum
- Gene Ontology: AmiGO / QuickGO
Search
- PMC: articles
- PubMed: articles
- NCBI: proteins

Diphosphate-glycerol phosphotransferase (EC 2.7.1.79) is an enzyme that catalyzes the chemical reaction

diphosphate +
glycerol
phosphate +
glycerol 1-phosphate

The enzyme characterised from mammals converts glycerol to glycerol 1-phosphate by transferring a phosphate group from pyrophosphoric acid.

This enzyme is a transferase, specifically one transferring phosphorus-containing groups (phosphotransferases) with an alcohol group as acceptor. The systematic name of this enzyme class is diphosphate:glycerol 1-phosphotransferase. Other names in common use include PPi-glycerol phosphotransferase, and pyrophosphate-glycerol phosphotransferase.
