= Glycerol-3-phosphate dehydrogenase (quinone) =

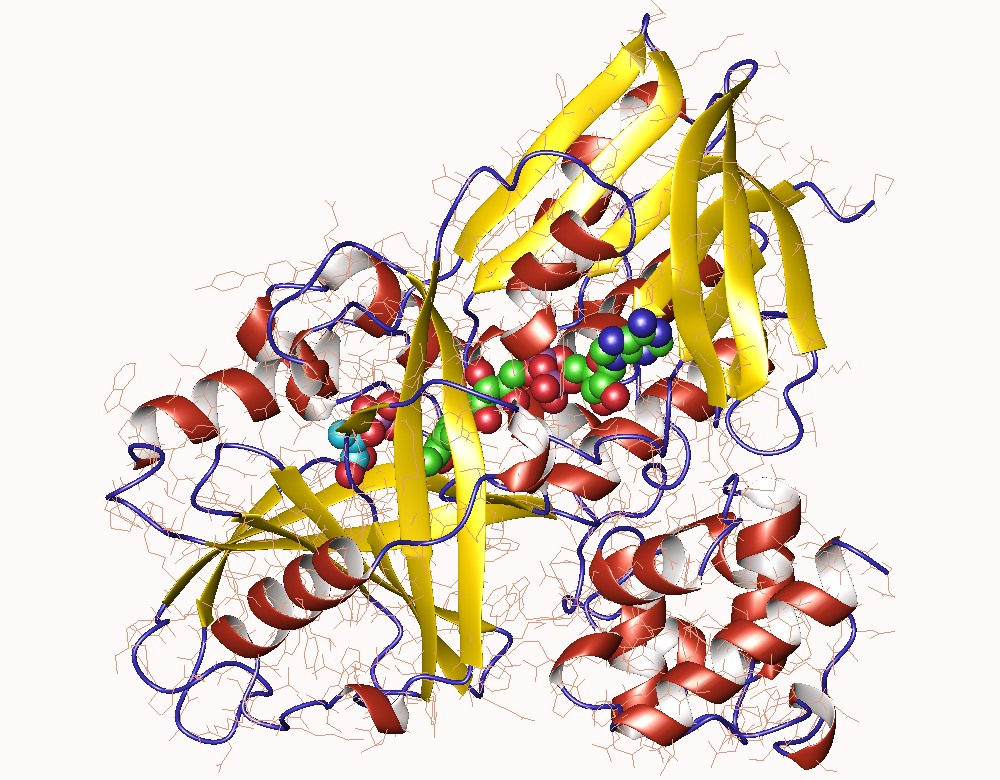
- Glycerol-3-phosphate dehydrogenase monomer + FAD, E.Coli

Identifiers
- EC no.: 1.1.5.3
- CAS no.: 9001-49-4
- Alt. names: valpha-glycerophosphate dehydrogenase, alpha-glycerophosphate dehydrogenase (acceptor), anaerobic glycerol-3-phosphate dehydrogenase, DL-glycerol 3-phosphate oxidase (misleading), FAD-dependent glycerol-3-phosphate dehydrogenase, FAD-dependent sn-glycerol-3-phosphate dehydrogenase, FAD-GPDH, FAD-linked glycerol 3-phosphate dehydrogenase, FAD-linked L-glycerol-3-phosphate dehydrogenase, flavin-linked glycerol-3-phosphate dehydrogenase, flavoprotein-linked L-glycerol 3-phosphate dehydrogenase, glycerol 3-phosphate cytochrome c reductase (misleading), glycerol phosphate dehydrogenase, glycerol phosphate dehydrogenase (acceptor), glycerol phosphate dehydrogenase (FAD), glycerol-3-phosphate CoQ reductase, glycerol-3-phosphate dehydrogenase (flavin-linked), glycerol-3-phosphate:CoQ reductase, glycerophosphate dehydrogenase, L-3-glycerophosphate-ubiquinone oxidoreductase, L-glycerol-3-phosphate dehydrogenase (ambiguous), L-glycerophosphate dehydrogenase, mGPD, mitochondrial glycerol phosphate dehydrogenase, NAD+-independent glycerol phosphate dehydrogenase, pyridine nucleotide-independent L-glycerol 3-phosphate dehydrogenase, sn-glycerol 3-phosphate oxidase (misleading), sn-glycerol-3-phosphate dehydrogenase, sn-glycerol-3-phosphate:(acceptor) 2-oxidoreductase, sn-glycerol-3-phosphate:acceptor 2-oxidoreductase)

Databases
- IntEnz: IntEnz view
- BRENDA: BRENDA entry
- ExPASy: NiceZyme view
- KEGG: KEGG entry
- MetaCyc: metabolic pathway
- PRIAM: profile
- PDB structures: RCSB PDB PDBe PDBsum
Search
- PMC: articles
- PubMed: articles
- NCBI: proteins

Glycerol-3-phosphate dehydrogenase (EC 1.1.5.3 is an enzyme with systematic name sn-glycerol 3-phosphate:quinone oxidoreductase. This enzyme catalyses the following chemical reaction

sn glycerol 3-phosphate
+ ubiquinone
dihydroxyacetone phosphate
+ ubiquinol

This flavin-dependent dehydrogenase is a membrane enzyme. It participates in glycolysis, respiration and phospholipid biosynthesis.
