= Glycerol-3-phosphate dehydrogenase 1 =

Protein-coding gene in the species Homo sapiens

GPD1

Identifiers
- Aliases: GPD1, GPD-C, GPDH-C, HTGTI, glycerol-3-phosphate dehydrogenase 1
- External IDs: OMIM: 138420; MGI: 95679; GeneCards: GPD1
Available structures
PDB	Ortholog search: PDBe RCSB
PDB	List of PDB id codes 1WPQ, 1X0V, 1X0X
Enzyme activity
EC #	BRENDA	ExPASy	KEGG	MetaCyc
1.1.1.8	↗	↗	↗	↗

Gene location (Human)
Chr.	Chromosome 12 (human)
Band	12q13.12	Start	50,103,982 bp
Band	12q13.12	End	50,111,313 bp

Gene location (Mouse)
Chr.	Chromosome 15 (mouse)
Band	15 F1|15 56.13 cM	Start	99,615,396 bp
Band	15 F1|15 56.13 cM	End	99,622,886 bp
RNA expression pattern
Bgee	Human / Mouse (ortholog); Top expressed in: subcutaneous adipose tissue; muscle of thigh; gastrocnemius muscle; abdominal fat; triceps brachii muscle; vastus lateralis muscle; C1 segment; right lobe of liver; Skeletal muscle tissue of rectus abdominis; Skeletal muscle tissue of biceps brachii / Top expressed in: brown adipose tissue; lactiferous gland; muscle of thigh; tunica adventitia of aorta; vastus lateralis muscle; triceps brachii muscle; intercostal muscle; subcutaneous adipose tissue; sternocleidomastoid muscle; ankle joint; More reference expression data
BioGPS	n/a
Gene ontology
Molecular function	oxidoreductase activity, acting on the CH-OH group of donors, NAD or NADP as acceptor; protein homodimerization activity; NAD binding; glycerol-3-phosphate dehydrogenase [NAD+ activity]; oxidoreductase activity; glycerol-3-phosphate dehydrogenase (quinone) activity; glycerol-3-phosphate dehydrogenase [NAD(P)+ activity]
Cellular component	cytoplasm; cytosol; glycerol-3-phosphate dehydrogenase complex; mitochondrion; extracellular exosome
Biological process	phosphatidic acid biosynthetic process; glycerolipid metabolic process; gluconeogenesis; glycerol-3-phosphate catabolic process; cellular response to tumor necrosis factor; glycerol-3-phosphate metabolic process; NADH metabolic process; NADH oxidation; glycerophosphate shuttle; positive regulation of glycolytic process; cellular response to cAMP; carbohydrate metabolic process
Sources:Amigo / QuickGO
Orthologs
Databases	NCBI: entry; OMA: entry
Species	Human	Mouse
Entrez	2819	14555
Ensembl	ENSG00000167588	ENSMUSG00000023019
UniProt	P21695	P13707
RefSeq (mRNA)	NM_005276; NM_001257199	NM_010271
RefSeq (protein)	NP_001244128; NP_005267	NP_034401
Location (UCSC)	Chr 12: 50.1 – 50.11 Mb	Chr 15: 99.62 – 99.62 Mb
PubMed search
- Wikidata
View/Edit Human	View/Edit Mouse

Glycerol-3-phosphate dehydrogenase 1 is an enzyme that is encoded by the GPD1 gene in humans.

== Function ==
This gene encodes a member of the NAD-dependent glycerol-3-phosphate dehydrogenase family. The encoded protein plays a critical role in carbohydrate and lipid metabolism by catalyzing the reversible conversion of dihydroxyacetone phosphate (DHAP) and reduced nicotine adenine dinucleotide (NADH) to glycerol 3-phosphate (G3P) and NAD+.

The encoded cytosolic protein and mitochondrial glycerol-3-phosphate dehydrogenase also form a glycerol phosphate shuttle that facilitates the transfer of reducing equivalents from the cytosol to mitochondria.

Mutations in this gene are a cause of transient infantile hypertriglyceridemia. Alternatively spliced transcript variants encoding multiple isoforms have been observed for this gene.
