= Phosphoglycerol geranylgeranyltransferase =

Enzyme

phosphoglycerol geranylgeranyltransferase

Identifiers
- EC no.: 2.5.1.41
- CAS no.: 124650-69-7

Databases
- IntEnz: IntEnz view
- BRENDA: BRENDA entry
- ExPASy: NiceZyme view
- KEGG: KEGG entry
- MetaCyc: metabolic pathway
- PRIAM: profile
- PDB structures: RCSB PDB PDBe PDBsum
- Gene Ontology: AmiGO / QuickGO
Search
- PMC: articles
- PubMed: articles
- NCBI: proteins

In enzymology, a phosphoglycerol geranylgeranyltransferase (EC 2.5.1.41) is an enzyme that catalyzes the chemical reaction

geranylgeranyl diphosphate + sn-glyceryl 1-phosphate $\rightleftharpoons$ diphosphate + sn-3-O-(geranylgeranyl)glyceryl 1-phosphate

Thus, the two substrates of this enzyme are geranylgeranyl diphosphate and sn-glyceryl 1-phosphate, whereas its two products are diphosphate and sn-3-O-(geranylgeranyl)glyceryl 1-phosphate.

This enzyme belongs to the family of transferases, specifically those transferring aryl or alkyl groups other than methyl groups. The systematic name of this enzyme class is geranylgeranyl diphosphate:sn-glyceryl phosphate geranylgeranyltransferase. Other names in common use include glycerol phosphate geranylgeranyltransferase, geranylgeranyl-transferase, and prenyltransferase.
