= Aspartate transaminase =

Enzyme involved in amino acid metabolism

aspartate transaminase
- Chicken aspartate aminotransferase with the bound coenzyme pyridoxal 5-phosphate. PDB: 7AAT

Identifiers
- EC no.: 2.6.1.1
- CAS no.: 9000-97-9

Databases
- BRENDA: enzyme data
- ExPASy: NiceZyme view
- KEGG: enzyme entry
- MetaCyc: metabolic pathway
- Rhea: reactions
- PDB structures: RCSB PDB PDBe PDBsum
- Gene Ontology: AmiGO / QuickGO
Search
- PMC: articles
- PubMed: articles
- NCBI: proteins

Aspartate transaminase (AST) or aspartate aminotransferase, also known as AspAT/ASAT/AAT or (serum) glutamic oxaloacetic transaminase (GOT, SGOT), is a pyridoxal phosphate (PLP)-dependent transaminase enzyme (EC 2.6.1.1) that was first described by Arthur Karmen and colleagues in 1954. AST catalyzes the reversible transfer of an α-amino group between aspartate and glutamate and, as such, is an important enzyme in amino acid metabolism. AST is found in the liver, heart, skeletal muscle, kidneys, brain, red blood cells and gall bladder. Serum AST level, serum ALT (alanine transaminase) level, and their ratio (AST/ALT ratio) are commonly measured clinically as biomarkers for liver health. The tests are part of blood panels.

The half-life of total AST in the circulation approximates 17 hours and, on average, 87 hours for mitochondrial AST. Aminotransferase is cleared by sinusoidal cells in the liver.

== Isoenzymes ==
Two isoenzymes are present in a wide variety of eukaryotes. In humans:

- GOT1/cAST, the cytosolic isoenzyme derives mainly from red blood cells and heart.
- GOT2/mAST, the mitochondrial isoenzyme is present predominantly in liver.

These isoenzymes are thought to have evolved from a common ancestral AST via gene duplication, and they share a sequence homology of approximately 45%.

AST has also been found in a number of microorganisms, including E. coli, H. mediterranei, and T. thermophilus. In E. coli, the enzyme is encoded by the aspCgene and has also been shown to exhibit the activity of an aromatic-amino-acid transaminase (EC 2.6.1.57).

== Structure ==
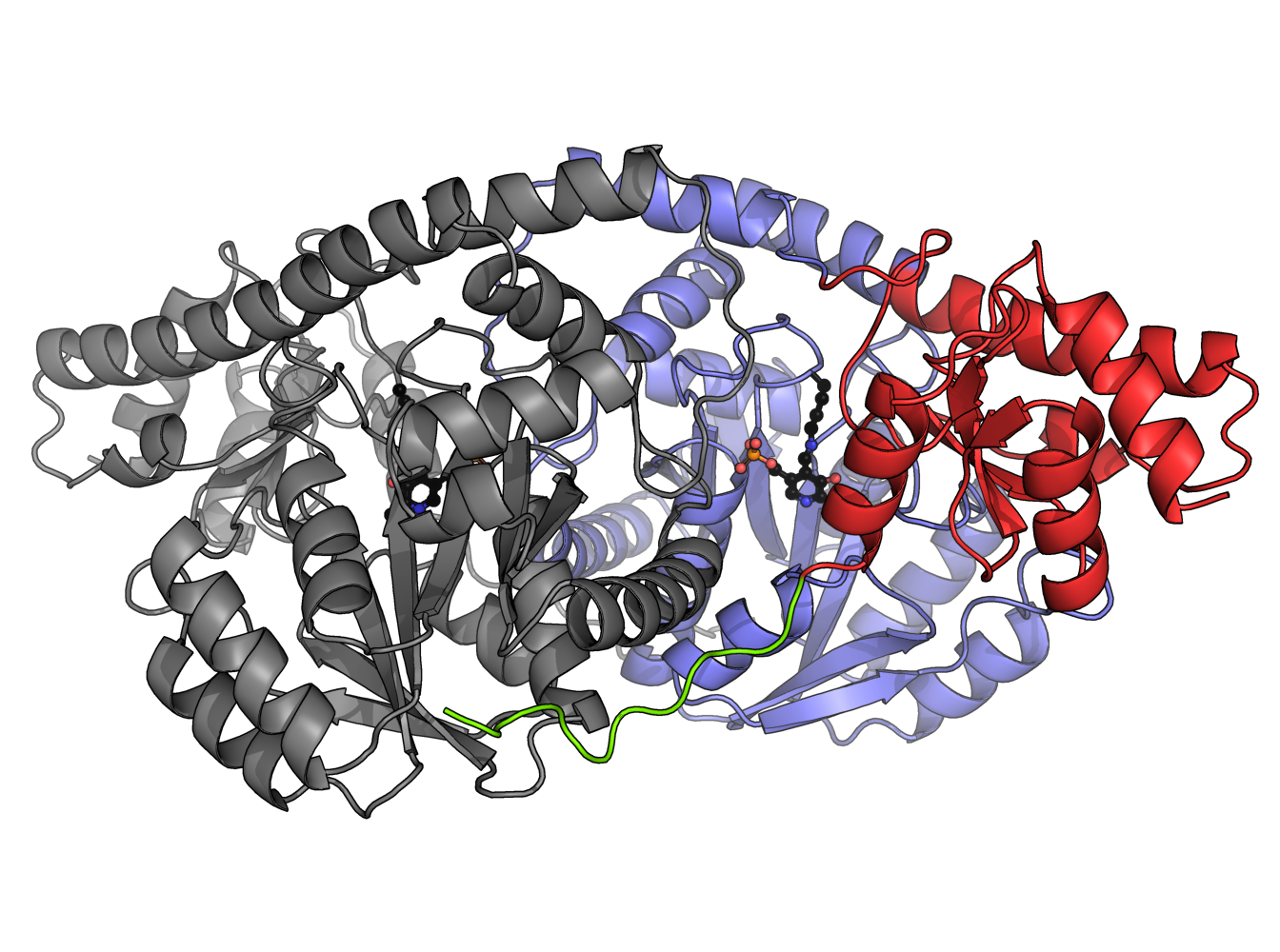
Structure of the aspartate transaminase dimer from chicken heart mitochondria. The large and small domains are coloured blue and red, respectively with the N-terminal residues highlighted in green. PDB: 7AAT

X-ray crystallography studies have been performed to determine the structure of aspartate transaminase from various sources, including chicken mitochondria, pig heart cytosol, and E. coli. Overall, the three-dimensional polypeptide structure for all species is quite similar. AST is dimeric, consisting of two identical subunits, each with approximately 400 amino acid residues and a molecular weight of approximately 45 kD. Each subunit is composed of a large and a small domain, as well as a third domain consisting of the N-terminal residues 3–14; these few residues form a strand, which links and stabilizes the two subunits of the dimer. The large domain, which includes residues 48–325, binds the PLP cofactor via an aldimine linkage to the ε-amino group of Lys258. Other residues in this domain—Asp222 and Tyr225—also interact with PLP via hydrogen bonding. The small domain consists of residues 15–47 and 326–410 and represents a flexible region that shifts the enzyme from an "open" to a "closed" conformation upon substrate binding.

The two independent active sites are positioned near the interface between the two domains. Within each active site, a couple arginine residues are responsible for the enzyme's specificity for dicarboxylic acid substrates: Arg386 interacts with the substrate's proximal (α-)carboxylate group, while Arg292 complexes with the distal (side-chain) carboxylate.

In terms of secondary structure, AST contains both α and β elements. Each domain has a central sheet of β-strands with α-helices packed on either side.

== Function ==
Aspartate transaminase catalyzes the interconversion of the natural amino acid, L-aspartic acid and α-ketoglutaric acid to give oxaloacetic acid and L-glutamic acid.:

Aspartic acid
+
α-Ketoglutaric acid
Oxaloacetic acid
+
Glutamic acid

As a prototypical transaminase, AST relies on PLP (vitamin B_{6}) as a cofactor to transfer the amino group from aspartate or glutamate to the corresponding ketoacid. In the process, the cofactor shuttles between PLP and the pyridoxamine phosphate (PMP) form. The amino group transfer catalyzed by this enzyme is crucial in both amino acid degradation and biosynthesis. In amino acid degradation, following the conversion of α-ketoglutarate to glutamate, glutamate subsequently undergoes oxidative deamination to form ammonium ions, which are excreted as urea. In the reverse reaction, aspartate may be synthesized from oxaloacetate, which is a key intermediate in the citric acid cycle.

== Mechanism ==
Aspartate transaminase, as with all transaminases, operates via dual substrate recognition; that is, it is able to recognize and selectively bind two amino acids (Asp and Glu) with different side-chains. In either case, the transaminase reaction consists of two similar half-reactions that constitute what is referred to as a ping-pong mechanism. In the first half-reaction, amino acid 1 (e.g., L-Asp) reacts with the enzyme-PLP complex to generate ketoacid 1 (oxaloacetate) and the modified enzyme-PMP. In the second half-reaction, ketoacid 2 (α-ketoglutarate) reacts with enzyme-PMP to produce amino acid 2 (L-Glu), regenerating the original enzyme-PLP in the process. Formation of a racemic product (D-Glu) is very rare.

The specific steps for the half-reaction of enzyme-PLP + aspartate $\rightleftharpoons$ enzyme-PMP + oxaloacetate are as follows (see figure); the other half-reaction (not shown) proceeds in the reverse manner, with α-ketoglutarate as the substrate.

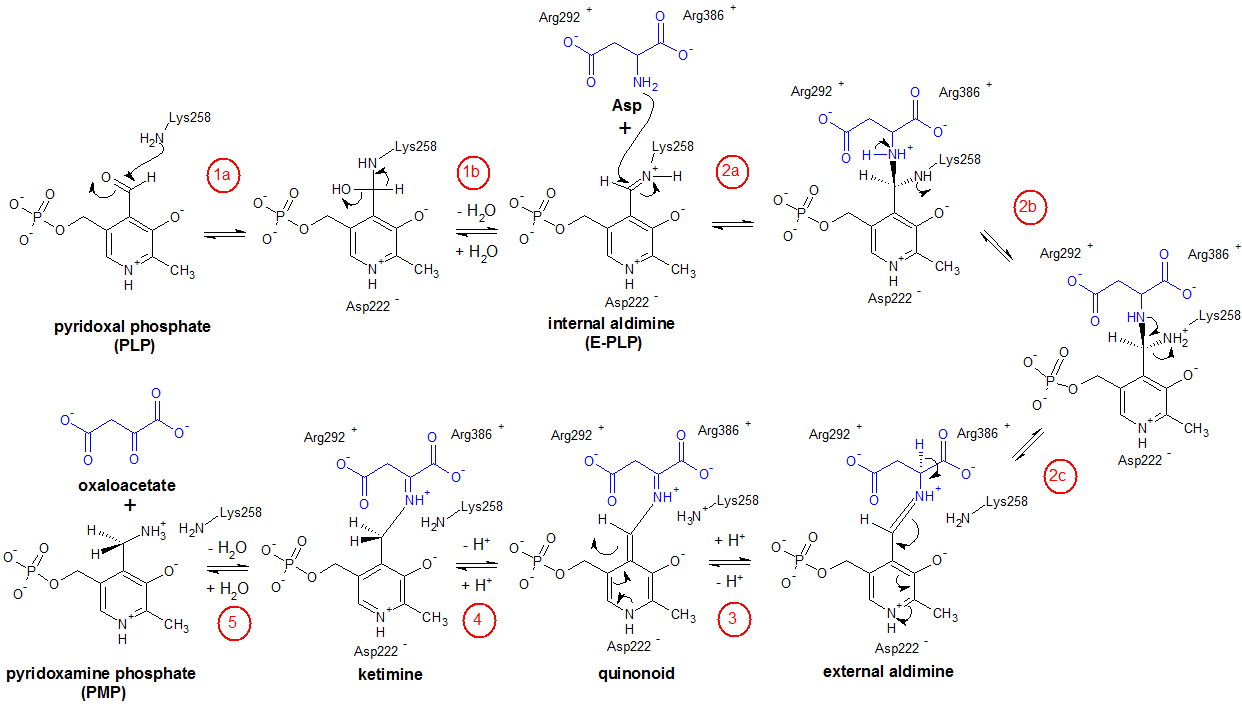
Reaction mechanism for aspartate aminotransferase

1. Internal aldimine formation: First, the ε-amino group of Lys258 forms a Schiff base linkage with the aldehyde carbon to generate an internal aldimine.
2. Transaldimination: The internal aldimine then becomes an external aldimine when the ε-amino group of Lys258 is displaced by the amino group of aspartate. This transaldimination reaction occurs via a nucleophilic attack by the deprotonated amino group of Asp and proceeds through a tetrahedral intermediate. As this point, the carboxylate groups of Asp are stabilized by the guanidinium groups of the enzyme's Arg386 and Arg292 residues.
3. Quinonoid formation: The hydrogen attached to the α-carbon of Asp is then abstracted (Lys258 is thought to be the proton acceptor) to form a quinonoid intermediate.
4. Ketimine formation: The quinonoid is reprotonated, but now at the aldehyde carbon, to form the ketimine intermediate.
5. Ketimine hydrolysis: Finally, the ketimine is hydrolyzed to form PMP and oxaloacetate.

This mechanism is thought to have multiple partially rate-determining steps. However, it has been shown that the substrate binding step (transaldimination) drives the catalytic reaction forward.

== Clinical significance ==
AST is similar to alanine transaminase (ALT) in that both enzymes are associated with liver parenchymal cells. The difference is that ALT is found predominantly in the liver, with clinically negligible quantities found in the kidneys, heart, and skeletal muscle, while AST is found in the liver, heart (cardiac muscle), skeletal muscle, kidneys, brain, and red blood cells. As a result, ALT is a more specific indicator of liver inflammation than AST, as AST may be elevated also in diseases affecting other organs, such as myocardial infarction, acute pancreatitis, acute hemolytic anemia, severe burns, acute renal disease, musculoskeletal diseases, and trauma.

The elevated AST level in hemorrhagic fever caused by crimean-congo hemorrhagic fever virus is associated with high mortality rate.

AST was defined as a biochemical marker for the diagnosis of acute myocardial infarction in 1954. However, the use of AST for such a diagnosis is now redundant and has been superseded by the cardiac troponins.

Laboratory tests should always be interpreted using the reference range from the laboratory that performed the test. Example reference ranges are shown below:

Patient type	Reference ranges
Male	8–40 IU/L
Female	6–34 IU/L

== See also ==
- Alanine transaminase (ALT/ALAT/SGPT)
- Transaminases
