= Glycerol dehydrogenase (acceptor) =

glycerol dehydrogenase (acceptor)

Identifiers
- EC no.: 1.1.99.22
- CAS no.: 249285-11-8

Databases
- IntEnz: IntEnz view
- BRENDA: BRENDA entry
- ExPASy: NiceZyme view
- KEGG: KEGG entry
- MetaCyc: metabolic pathway
- PRIAM: profile
- PDB structures: RCSB PDB PDBe PDBsum
- Gene Ontology: AmiGO / QuickGO
Search
- PMC: articles
- PubMed: articles
- NCBI: proteins

In enzymology, glycerol dehydrogenase (acceptor) (EC 1.1.99.22) is an enzyme that catalyzes the chemical reaction

glycerol
+ electron
acceptor
dihydroxyacetone
+ reduced
acceptor

The two substrates of this enzyme are glycerol and an electron acceptor. Its products are dihydroxyacetone and the corresponding reduced acceptor.

This enzyme belongs to the family of oxidoreductases, specifically those acting on the CH-OH group of donor with other acceptors. The systematic name of this enzyme class is glycerol:acceptor 1-oxidoreductase. This enzyme is also called glycerol:(acceptor) 1-oxidoreductase. It employs one cofactor, PQQ.
