= GOT1 =

Cytoplasmic enzyme involved in amino acid metabolism

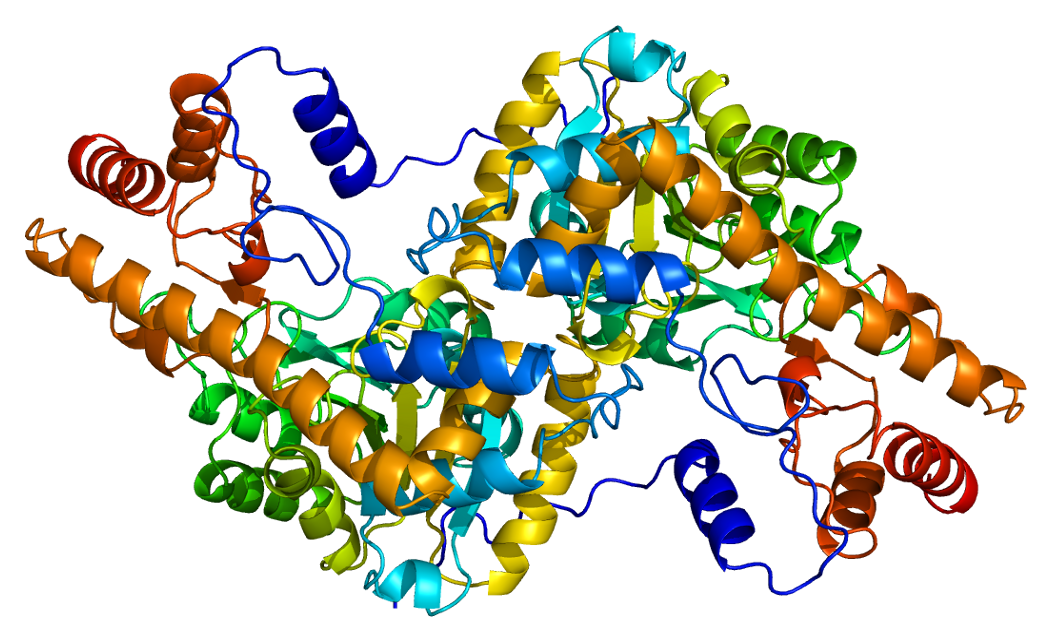

Identifiers
- Aliases: GOT1, ASTQTL1, GIG18, cAspAT, cCAT, AST1, glutamic-oxaloacetic transaminase 1
- External IDs: OMIM: 138180; MGI: 95791; GeneCards: GOT1
Available structures
PDB	Ortholog search: PDBe RCSB
PDB	List of PDB id codes 3II0, 3WZF
Enzyme activity
EC #	BRENDA	ExPASy	KEGG	MetaCyc
2.6.1.1	↗	↗	↗	↗
2.6.1.3	↗	↗	↗	↗

Gene location (Human)
Chr.	Chromosome 10 (human)
Band	10q24.2	Start	99,396,870 bp
Band	10q24.2	End	99,430,624 bp

Gene location (Mouse)
Chr.	Chromosome 19 (mouse)
Band	19 C3|19 36.67 cM	Start	43,488,191 bp
Band	19 C3|19 36.67 cM	End	43,513,044 bp
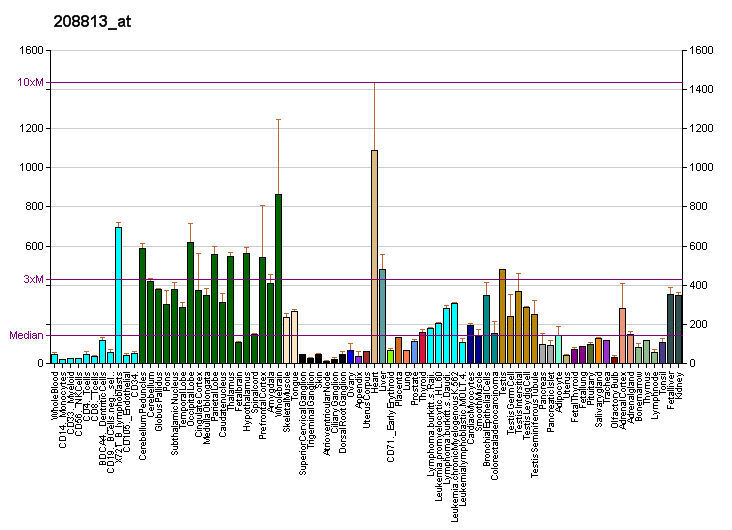
RNA expression pattern
Bgee	Human / Mouse (ortholog); Top expressed in: right ventricle; myocardium of left ventricle; apex of heart; cardiac muscle tissue of right atrium; body of tongue; right auricle of heart; vastus lateralis muscle; muscle of thigh; Skeletal muscle tissue of rectus abdominis; prefrontal cortex / Top expressed in: extraocular muscle; right ventricle; digastric muscle; myocardium of ventricle; medial vestibular nucleus; temporal muscle; sternocleidomastoid muscle; pontine nuclei; cardiac muscles; deep cerebellar nuclei; More reference expression data
BioGPS	More reference expression data
Gene ontology
Molecular function	transferase activity; L-aspartate:2-oxoglutarate aminotransferase activity; L-cysteine:2-oxoglutarate aminotransferase activity; transaminase activity; catalytic activity; carboxylic acid binding; L-phenylalanine:2-oxoglutarate aminotransferase activity; phosphatidylserine decarboxylase activity; pyridoxal phosphate binding
Cellular component	cytoplasm; axon terminus; mitochondrion; lysosome; extracellular exosome; nucleus; nucleoplasm; cytosol
Biological process	Notch signaling pathway; gluconeogenesis; dicarboxylic acid metabolic process; aspartate metabolic process; aspartate catabolic process; cellular amino acid metabolic process; response to glucocorticoid; cellular amino acid biosynthetic process; biosynthetic process; 2-oxoglutarate metabolic process; oxaloacetate metabolic process; glutamate catabolic process to 2-oxoglutarate; aspartate biosynthetic process; fatty acid homeostasis; cellular response to insulin stimulus; glutamate catabolic process to aspartate; glutamate metabolic process; glycerol biosynthetic process; response to carbohydrate; positive regulation of transforming growth factor beta receptor signaling pathway; negative regulation of collagen biosynthetic process; response to immobilization stress; response to cadmium ion; negative regulation of cytosolic calcium ion concentration; negative regulation of mitochondrial depolarization; transdifferentiation; cellular response to mechanical stimulus; response to transition metal nanoparticle
Sources:Amigo / QuickGO
Orthologs
Databases	NCBI: entry; OMA: entry
Species	Human	Mouse
Entrez	2805	14718
Ensembl	ENSG00000120053	ENSMUSG00000025190
UniProt	P17174	P05201
RefSeq (mRNA)	NM_002079	NM_010324
RefSeq (protein)	NP_002070	NP_034454
Location (UCSC)	Chr 10: 99.4 – 99.43 Mb	Chr 19: 43.49 – 43.51 Mb
PubMed search
- Wikidata
View/Edit Human	View/Edit Mouse

Aspartate aminotransferase, cytoplasmic is an enzyme that in humans is encoded by the GOT1 gene.

Glutamic–oxaloacetic transaminase is a pyridoxal phosphate-dependent enzyme which exists in cytoplasmic and mitochondrial forms, GOT1 and GOT2, respectively. GOT plays a role in amino acid metabolism and the urea and tricarboxylic acid cycles. The two enzymes are homodimeric and show close homology.

== Interactive pathway map ==
Click on genes, proteins and metabolites below to link to respective articles. (Note: The interactive pathway map can be edited at WikiPathways: "GlycolysisGluconeogenesis_WP534".)

Glycolysis and Gluconeogenesis edit
