= GOT2 =

Mitochondrial enzyme involved in amino acid metabolism

Identifiers
- Aliases: GOT2, KAT4, KATIV, mitAAT, KYAT4, glutamic-oxaloacetic transaminase 2, DEE82
- External IDs: OMIM: 138150; MGI: 95792; GeneCards: GOT2
Available structures
PDB	Ortholog search: PDBe RCSB
PDB	List of PDB id codes 5AX8
Enzyme activity
EC #	BRENDA	ExPASy	KEGG	MetaCyc
2.6.1.1	↗	↗	↗	↗
2.6.1.7	↗	↗	↗	↗

Gene location (Human)
Chr.	Chromosome 16 (human)
Band	16q21	Start	58,707,131 bp
Band	16q21	End	58,734,342 bp

Gene location (Mouse)
Chr.	Chromosome 8 (mouse)
Band	8 D1|8 47.79 cM	Start	96,590,762 bp
Band	8 D1|8 47.79 cM	End	96,615,175 bp
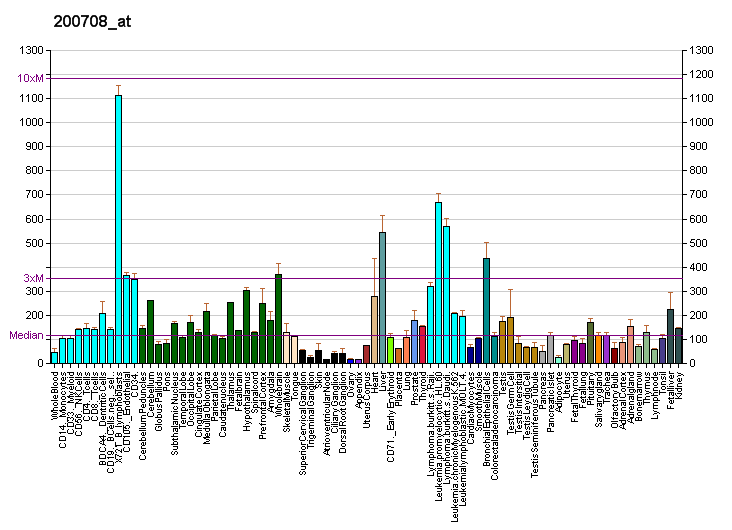
RNA expression pattern
Bgee	Human / Mouse (ortholog); Top expressed in: muscle of thigh; myocardium of left ventricle; right ventricle; gastrocnemius muscle; triceps brachii muscle; apex of heart; vastus lateralis muscle; middle temporal gyrus; right auricle of heart; glutes / Top expressed in: muscle of thigh; tail of embryo; lip; primary visual cortex; superior frontal gyrus; right kidney; yolk sac; dentate gyrus of hippocampal formation granule cell; genital tubercle; neural layer of retina; More reference expression data
BioGPS	More reference expression data
Gene ontology
Molecular function	protein homodimerization activity; catalytic activity; carboxylic acid binding; amino acid binding; enzyme binding; transaminase activity; transferase activity; kynurenine-oxoglutarate transaminase activity; phospholipid binding; L-phenylalanine:2-oxoglutarate aminotransferase activity; L-aspartate:2-oxoglutarate aminotransferase activity; RNA binding; pyridoxal phosphate binding; 4-hydroxyglutamate transaminase activity
Cellular component	perikaryon; myelin sheath; mitochondrial inner membrane; membrane; cell surface; extracellular exosome; mitochondrial matrix; plasma membrane; mitochondrion; T-tubule; protein-containing complex; sarcolemma
Biological process	fatty acid transport; cellular amino acid biosynthetic process; oxaloacetate metabolic process; dicarboxylic acid metabolic process; lipid transport; response to ethanol; gluconeogenesis; cellular amino acid metabolic process; glutamate metabolic process; aspartate biosynthetic process; L-kynurenine metabolic process; biosynthetic process; glutamate catabolic process to aspartate; aspartate catabolic process; glutamate catabolic process to 2-oxoglutarate; 2-oxoglutarate metabolic process; 4-hydroxyproline catabolic process; aspartate metabolic process; glyoxylate metabolic process; transport; female pregnancy; lactation; response to muscle activity; response to insulin; response to morphine
Sources:Amigo / QuickGO
Orthologs
Databases	NCBI: entry; OMA: entry
Species	Human	Mouse
Entrez	2806	14719
Ensembl	ENSG00000125166	ENSMUSG00000031672
UniProt	P00505	P05202
RefSeq (mRNA)	NM_002080; NM_001286220	NM_010325
RefSeq (protein)	NP_001273149; NP_002071	NP_034455
Location (UCSC)	Chr 16: 58.71 – 58.73 Mb	Chr 8: 96.59 – 96.62 Mb
PubMed search
- Wikidata
View/Edit Human	View/Edit Mouse

Aspartate aminotransferase, mitochondrial, is an enzyme that in humans is encoded by the GOT2 gene. Glutamic–oxaloacetic transaminase is a pyridoxal phosphate-dependent enzyme which exists in cytoplasmic and inner-membrane mitochondrial forms, GOT1 and GOT2, respectively. GOT plays a role in amino acid metabolism and the urea and tricarboxylic acid cycle. Also, GOT2 is a major participant in the malate–aspartate shuttle, which is a passage from the cytosol to the mitochondria. The two enzymes are homodimeric and show close homology. GOT2 has been seen to have a role in cell proliferation, especially in terms of tumor growth.

== Structure ==
GOT2 is a dimer containing two identical subunits that hold overlapping subunit regions. The top and sides of the enzyme are made up of helices, while the bottom is formed by strands of beta sheets and extended hairpin loops. The subunit itself can be categorized into four different parts: a large domain, which binds pyridoxal-P, a small domain, an NH_{2}-terminal arm, and a bridge across two domains, which is formed by residues 48–75 and 301–358. Virtually ubiquitous in eukaryotic cells, GOT2 nucleic acid and protein sequences are highly conserved, and its 5′ regulatory regions in genomic DNA resemble those of typical house-keeping genes in that, e.g., they lack a TATA box. The GOT2 gene is also located on 16q21 and has an exon count of 10.

== Function ==
In order to produce the energy needed for everyday activities, the body needs to go through the process of glycolysis, which breaks down glucose into pyruvate. In this pathway, one very important part is the reduction of NAD^{+} to NADH and then the rapid oxidation of NADH back into NAD^{+}. The oxidation phase mainly occurs in the mitochondria as part of the electron transport chain, but the transfer of NADH into the mitochondria from the cytosol is impossible, due to the impermeability of the inner mitochondrial membrane to NADH. Therefore, the malate-aspartate shuttle is needed to transfer reducing equivalents across the mitochondrial membrane for energy production. GOT2 and another enzyme, MDH, are essential for the functioning of the shuttle. GOT2 converts oxaloacetate into aspartate by transamination. This aspartate as well as alpha-ketoglutarate return into the cytosol, which is then converted back to oxaloacetate and glutamate, respectively.

Another function of GOT2 is that it is believed to transaminate kynurenine into kynurenic acid (KYNA) in the brain. The KYNA made by the GOT2 is thought to be an important factor in brain pathology. It is suggested that KYNA synthesized by GOT2 could constitute a common, and mechanistically relevant, feature of the neurotoxicity caused by mitochondrial poisons, such as rotenone, malonate, 1-methyl-4-phenylpyridinium, and 3-nitropropionic acid.

== Clinical significance ==
In nearly all cancer cells, glycolysis has been seen to be highly elevated to meet their increased energy, biosynthesis, and redox needs. Therefore, the malate-aspartate shuttle promotes the net transfer of cytosolic NADH into mitochondria to ensure a high rate of glycolysis in diverse cancer cell lines. In a study completed in 2008, inhibiting the malate-aspartate shuttle was found to impair the glycolysis process and essentially decreased breast adenocarcinoma cell proliferation. Furthermore, knocking down GOT2 and GOT1 has also been reported to inhibit cell proliferation and colony formation in pancreatic cancer cell lines, suggesting that the GOT enzyme is essential for maintaining a high rate of glycolysis to support rapid tumor cell growth. Also, both glucose and glutamine increase GOT2 3K acetylation in PANC-1 cells and that GOT2 3K acetylation plays a critical role in coordinating glucose and glutamine uptake to provide energy and support cell proliferation and tumor growth. This implies that inhibiting GOT2 3K acetylation may merit exploration as a therapeutic agent especially for pancreatic cancer.

Mutations in this gene have been associated with an early onset infantile encephalopathy.

== Interactions ==
GOT2 has been seen to interact with:

- oxaloacetate
- kynurenine
- aspartate
- alpha-ketoglutarate

== Interactive pathway map ==
Click on genes, proteins and metabolites below to link to respective articles. (Note: The interactive pathway map can be edited at WikiPathways: "GlycolysisGluconeogenesis_WP534".)

Glycolysis and Gluconeogenesis edit
