= Glycerol-3-phosphate 1-dehydrogenase (NADP+) =

Class of enzymes

glycerol-3-phosphate 1-dehydrogenase (NADP^{+})

Identifiers
- EC no.: 1.1.1.177
- CAS no.: 37213-46-0

Databases
- IntEnz: IntEnz view
- BRENDA: BRENDA entry
- ExPASy: NiceZyme view
- KEGG: KEGG entry
- MetaCyc: metabolic pathway
- PRIAM: profile
- PDB structures: RCSB PDB PDBe PDBsum
- Gene Ontology: AmiGO / QuickGO
Search
- PMC: articles
- PubMed: articles
- NCBI: proteins

In enzymology, glycerol-3-phosphate 1-dehydrogenase (NADP^{+}) (EC 1.1.1.177) is an enzyme that catalyzes the chemical reaction

sn-glycerol 3-phosphate
+ NADP^{+}
H^{+}
H^{+}
D-glyceraldehyde 3-phosphate
+ NADPH

Thus, the two substrates of this enzyme are sn-glycerol 3-phosphate and oxidised nicotinamide adenine dinucleotide phosphate (NADP^{+}). Its products are D-glyceraldehyde 3-phosphate, reduced NADPH, and a proton.

This enzyme belongs to the family of oxidoreductases, specifically those acting on the CH-OH group of donor with NAD^{+} or NADP^{+} as acceptor. The systematic name of this enzyme class is sn-glycerol-3-phosphate:NADP^{+} 1-oxidoreductase. Other names in common use include glycerol phosphate (nicotinamide adenine dinucleotide phosphate), dehydrogenase, L-glycerol 3-phosphate:NADP^{+} oxidoreductase, glycerin-3-phosphate dehydrogenase, NADPH-dependent glycerin-3-phosphate dehydrogenase, and glycerol-3-phosphate 1-dehydrogenase (NADP^{+}).
