= Glycerol-1-phosphatase =

Class of enzymes

Identifiers
- EC no.: 3.1.3.21
- CAS no.: 37228-75-4

Databases
- BRENDA: enzyme data
- ExPASy: NiceZyme view
- KEGG: enzyme entry
- MetaCyc: metabolic pathway
- Rhea: reactions
- PDB structures: RCSB PDB PDBe PDBsum
- Gene Ontology: AmiGO / QuickGO
Search
- PMC: articles
- PubMed: articles
- NCBI: proteins

The enzyme glycerol-1-phosphatase (EC 3.1.3.21) catalyzes the reaction

glycerol 3-phosphate
H_{2}O
P_{i}
H_{2}O
P_{i}
glycerol

The enzyme characterised from Dunaliella salina hydrolyses racemic glycerol 3-phosphate to glycerol and orthophosphate.

Among the organisms that have been shown to express this enzymatic activity are Arabidopsis thaliana (plant) via the AtSgpp and AtGpp gene products; Dunaliella salina (alga); Saccharomyces cerevisiae (fungus) via the GPP1/RHR2/YIL053W and GPP2/HOR2/YER062C gene products; Candida albicans (fungus) via the GPP1 gene product; Mycobacterium tuberculosis (bacteria) via the rv1692 gene product; and C57BL/6N mice and Wistar rats (mammals) via the PGP gene product.

== Nomenclature ==
This enzyme is a hydrolase, specifically one acting on phosphoric monoester bonds. The systematic name is glycerol-1-phosphate phosphohydrolase. Other names in common use include α-glycerophosphatase, α-glycerol phosphatase, glycerol 3-phosphatase, glycerol-3-phosphate phosphatase, and glycerol 3-phosphate phosphohydrolase.
