= Glycerol 1-phosphate =

sn-Glycerol 1-phosphate

Names
- IUPAC name sn-Glycerol 1-(dihydrogen phosphate)
- Systematic IUPAC name (2S)-2,3-Dihydroxypropyl dihydrogen phosphate
- Other names (S)-2,3-dihydroxypropyl dihydrogen phosphate 1,2,3-propanetriol, 1-(dihydrogen phosphate), (2S)- L-glycerol 1-phosphate D-glycerol 3-phosphate D-α-glycerophosphate; D-α-phosphoglycerol glycero-1-phosphate O-phosphonoglycerol; 1-phosphoglycerol L-glycerol 1-phosphate D-glycerol 3-phosphate D-α-glycerophosphoric acid

Identifiers
CAS Number	5746-57-6
3D model (JSmol)	Interactive image
ChEBI	CHEBI:16221
ChemSpider	388409
KEGG	C00623
MeSH	Alpha-glycerophosphoric+acid
PubChem CID	439276
UNII	196623779E
CompTox Dashboard (EPA)	DTXSID501315267
- InChI: InChI=1S/C3H9O6P/c4-1-3(5)2-9-10(6,7)8/h3-5H,1-2H2,(H2,6,7,8)/t3-/m0/s1 Key: AWUCVROLDVIAJX-VKHMYHEASA-N
- SMILES: C([C@@H](COP(=O)(O)O)O)O

Properties
Chemical formula	C_{3}H_{7}O_{6}P
Molar mass	170.057 g·mol^{−1}
Appearance	colorless

Related compounds
Related organophosphates	Glycerol 2-phosphate Glycerol 3-phosphate
- Except where otherwise noted, data are given for materials in their standard state (at 25 °C [77 °F], 100 kPa). Infobox references

sn-Glycerol 1-phosphate (Note: This article uses stereospecific numbering where stereoconfiguration is not explicitly specified.) is the conjugate base of a phosphoric ester of glycerol. It is a component of ether lipids, which are common for archaea.

== Biosynthesis and metabolism ==
Glycerol 1-phosphate is synthesized by reducing dihydroxyacetone phosphate (DHAP), a glycolysis intermediate, with sn-glycerol-1-phosphate dehydrogenase. DHAP and thus glycerol 1-phosphate is also possible to be synthesized from amino acids and citric acid cycle intermediates via gluconeogenesis pathway.

+ NAD(P)H + H^{+} → + NAD(P)^{+}

Glycerol 1-phosphate is a starting material for de novo synthesis of ether lipids, such as those derived from archaeol and caldarchaeol. It is first geranylgeranylated on its sn-3 position by a cytosolic enzyme, phosphoglycerol geranylgeranyltransferase. A second geranylgeranyl group is then added on the sn-2 position making unsaturated archaetidic acid.

== Lipid divide ==
Organisms other than archaea, i.e. bacteria and eukaryotes, use the enantiomer glycerol 3-phosphate for producing their cell membranes. The fact that archaea use the flipped chirality compared to these two groups is termed a lipid divide. (The other part of the lipid divide is that archaea use ether lipids while bacteria and eukarya use ester lipids, though this has turned out to be a lot less strict than the chirality divide.) As of 2021, biologists still do not know how the lipid divide happened.

It is known from genetic engineering that cells (specifically modified E. coli) that produce both types of lipids at the same time are viable. Genetic evidence for a natural mixed-membrane system have also been found, pending definitive proof by chemical analysis. This lends to the idea that the common ancestor of bacteria and archaea, especially the last universal common ancestor, may have had a mixed membrane. Assuming this is the case, this still leaves open the question of why most current life forms only use one of these chiralities. One hypothesis involves the permeability of mixed and non-mixed membranes to common building blocks of life.

== See also ==
- List of unsolved problems in biology
