= Glycerol-3-phosphate dehydrogenase =

Class of enzymes

Glycerol-3-phosphate dehydrogenase (NAD^{+})
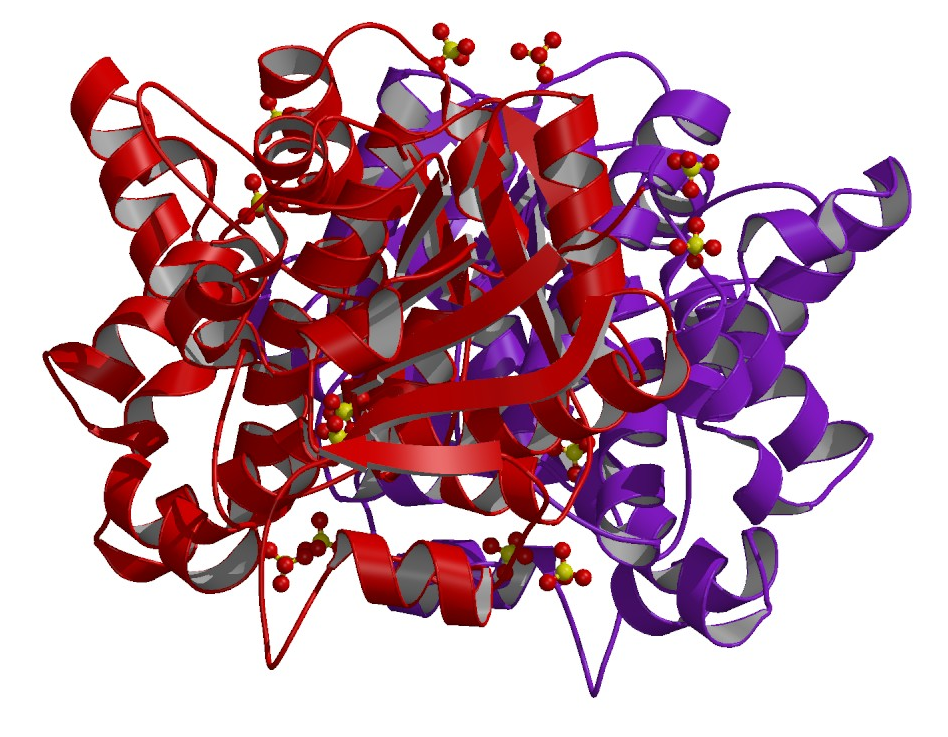
- Crystallographic structure of human glycerol-3-phosphate dehydrogenase 1.

Identifiers
- EC no.: 1.1.1.8
- CAS no.: 9075-65-4

Databases
- BRENDA: enzyme data
- ExPASy: NiceZyme view
- KEGG: enzyme entry
- MetaCyc: metabolic pathway
- Rhea: reactions
- PDB structures: RCSB PDB PDBe PDBsum
- Gene Ontology: AmiGO / QuickGO
Search
- PMC: articles
- PubMed: articles
- NCBI: proteins

Glycerol-3-phosphate dehydrogenase (quinone)

Identifiers
- EC no.: 1.1.5.3
- CAS no.: 9001-49-4

Databases
- BRENDA: enzyme data
- ExPASy: NiceZyme view
- KEGG: enzyme entry
- MetaCyc: metabolic pathway
- Rhea: reactions
- PDB structures: RCSB PDB PDBe PDBsum
Search
- PMC: articles
- PubMed: articles
- NCBI: proteins

NAD-dependent glycerol-3-phosphate dehydrogenase N-terminus
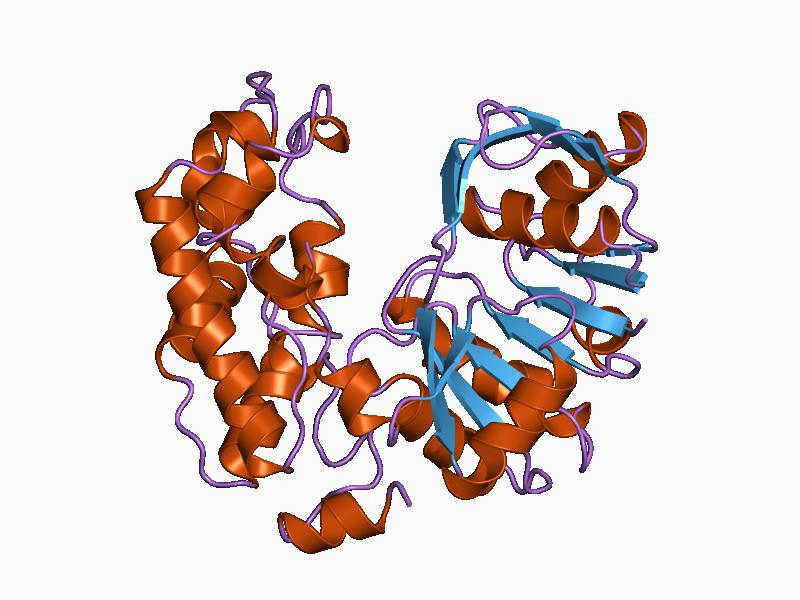
- crystal structure of the n-(1-d-carboxylethyl)-l-norvaline dehydrogenase from arthrobacter sp. strain 1c

Identifiers
- Symbol: NAD_Gly3P_dh_N
- Pfam: PF01210
- Pfam clan: CL0063
- InterPro: IPR011128
- PROSITE: PDOC00740
- SCOP2: 1m66 / SCOPe / SUPFAM
Available protein structures:
- PDB: IPR011128 PF01210 (ECOD; PDBsum)
- AlphaFold: IPR011128; PF01210

NAD-dependent glycerol-3-phosphate dehydrogenase C-terminus
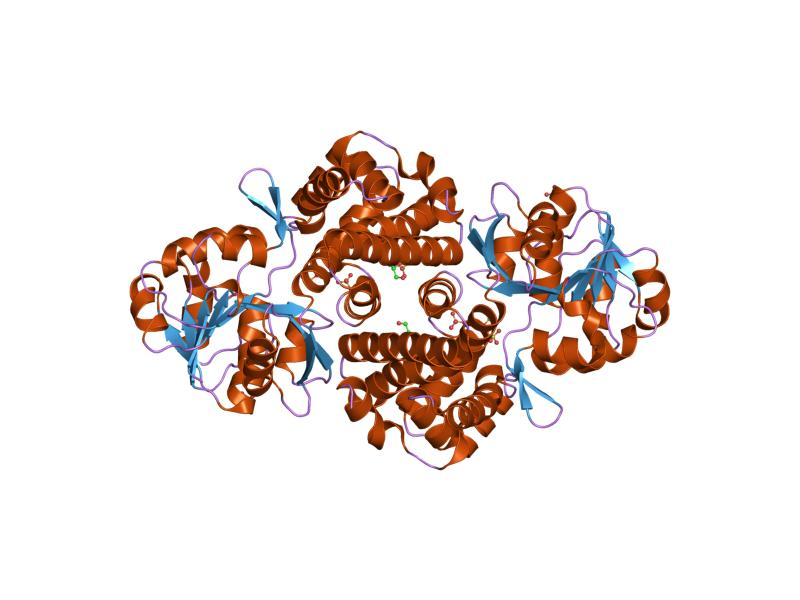
- structure of glycerol-3-phosphate dehydrogenase from archaeoglobus fulgidus

Identifiers
- Symbol: NAD_Gly3P_dh_C
- Pfam: PF07479
- Pfam clan: CL0106
- InterPro: IPR006109
- PROSITE: PDOC00740
- SCOP2: 1m66 / SCOPe / SUPFAM
Available protein structures:
- PDB: IPR006109 PF07479 (ECOD; PDBsum)
- AlphaFold: IPR006109; PF07479

Glycerol-3-phosphate dehydrogenase (GPDH) is an enzyme that catalyzes the reversible redox conversion of dihydroxyacetone phosphate (a.k.a. glycerone phosphate, outdated) to sn-glycerol 3-phosphate.

Glycerol-3-phosphate dehydrogenase serves as a major link between carbohydrate metabolism and lipid metabolism. It is also a major contributor of electrons to the electron transport chain in the mitochondria.

Older terms for glycerol-3-phosphate dehydrogenase include alpha glycerol-3-phosphate dehydrogenase (alphaGPDH) and glycerolphosphate dehydrogenase (GPDH). However, glycerol-3-phosphate dehydrogenase is not the same as glyceraldehyde 3-phosphate dehydrogenase (GAPDH), whose substrate is an aldehyde not an alcohol.

== Metabolic function ==
GPDH plays a major role in lipid biosynthesis. Through the reduction of dihydroxyacetone phosphate into glycerol 3-phosphate, GPDH allows the prompt dephosphorylation of glycerol 3-phosphate into glycerol. Additionally, GPDH is one of the enzymes involved in maintaining the redox potential across the inner mitochondrial membrane.

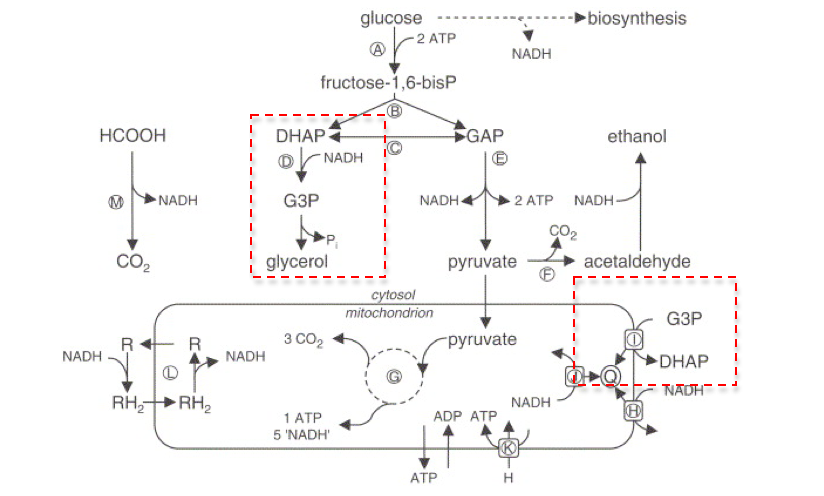
Fig. 1. Schematic overview of fermentative and oxidative glucose metabolism of Saccharomyces cerevisiae. (A) upper part of glycolysis, which includes two sugar phosphorylation reactions. (B) fructose-1,6-bisphosphate aldolase, splitting the C6-molecule into two triose phosphates (C) triosephosphate isomerase, interconverting DHAP and GAP. (D) glycerol pathway reducing DHAP to glycerol-3-phosphate (G3P) by G3P dehydrogenase, followed by dephosphorylation to glycerol by G3Pase. (E) The lower part of glycolysis converts GAP to pyruvate while generating 1 NADH and 2 ATP via a series of 5 enzymes. (F) Alcoholic fermentation; decarboxylation of pyruvate by pyruvate decarboxylase, followed by reduction of acetaldehyde to ethanol. (G) mitochondrial pyruvate-dehydrogenase converts pyruvate to acetyl-CoA, which enters the tricarboxylic acid cycle. (H) external mitochondrial NADH dehydrogenases. (I) mitochondrial G3P dehydrogenase. Electrons of these three dehydrogenases enter the respiratory chain at the level of the quinol pool (Q). (J) internal mitochondrial NADH dehydrogenase. (K) ATP synthase. (L) generalized scheme of NADH shuttle. (M) formate oxidation by formate dehydrogenase.

== Reaction ==
The NAD+/NADH coenzyme couple act as an electron reservoir for metabolic redox reactions, carrying electrons from one reaction to another. Most of these metabolism reactions occur in the mitochondria. To regenerate NAD+ for further use, NADH pools in the cytosol must be reoxidized. Since the mitochondrial inner membrane is impermeable to both NADH and NAD+, these cannot be freely exchanged between the cytosol and mitochondrial matrix.

One way to shuttle this reducing equivalent across the membrane is through the Glycerol-3-phosphate shuttle, which employs the two forms of GPDH:

- Cytosolic GPDH, or GPD1, is localized to the outer membrane of the mitochondria facing the cytosol, and catalyzes the reduction of dihydroxyacetone phosphate into glycerol-3-phosphate.
- In conjunction, Mitochondrial GPDH, or GPD2, is embedded on the outer surface of the inner mitochondrial membrane, overlooking the cytosol, and catalyzes the oxidation of glycerol-3-phosphate to dihydroxyacetone phosphate.

The reactions catalyzed by cytosolic (soluble) and mitochondrial GPDH are as follows:

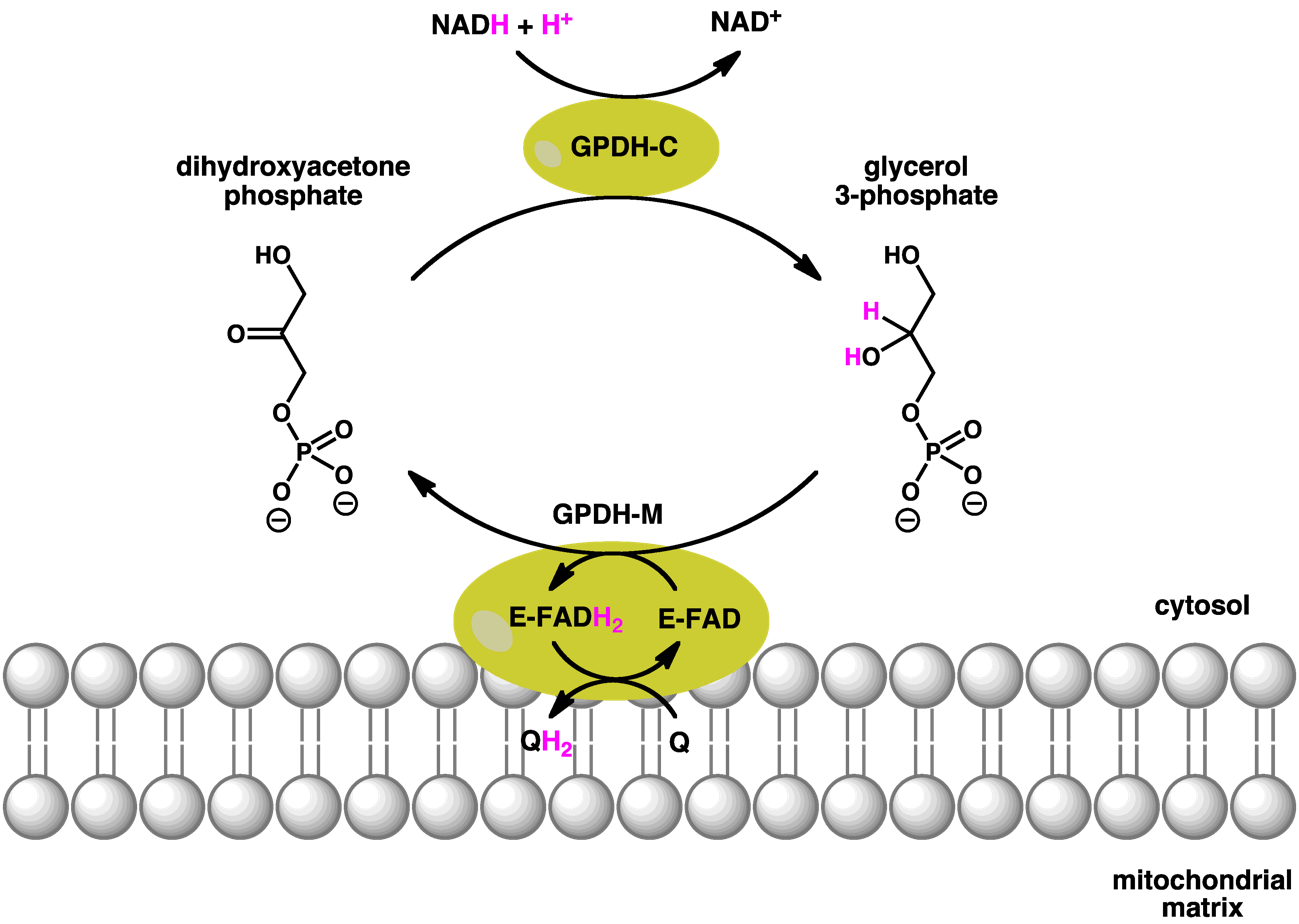
Coupled reactions catalyzed by the cytosolic (GPDH-C) and mitochondrial (GPDH-M) forms of glycerol 3-phosphate dehydrogenase. GPDH-C and GPDH-M use NADH and quinol (QH) as an electron donors respectively. GPDH-M in addition uses FAD as a co-factor.

== Variants ==
There are two forms of GPDH:

Enzyme			Protein			Gene	
EC number	Name	Donor / Acceptor	Name	Subcellular location	Abbreviation	Name	Symbol
1.1.1.8	glycerol-3-phosphate dehydrogenase	NADH / NAD^{+}	Glycerol-3-phosphate dehydrogenase [NAD^{+}]	cytoplasmic	GPDH-C	glycerol-3-phosphate dehydrogenase 1 (soluble)	GPD1
1.1.5.3	glycerol-3-phosphate dehydrogenase	quinol / quinone	Glycerol-3-phosphate dehydrogenase	mitochondrial	GPDH-M	glycerol-3-phosphate dehydrogenase 2 (mitochondrial)	GPD2

The following human genes encode proteins with GPDH enzymatic activity:

glycerol-3-phosphate dehydrogenase 1 (soluble)

Identifiers
- Symbol: GPD1
- NCBI gene: 2819
- HGNC: 4455
- OMIM: 138420
- RefSeq: NM_005276
- UniProt: P21695

Other data
- EC number: 1.1.1.8
- Locus: Chr. 12 q12-q13
Search for
- Structures: Swiss-model
- Domains: InterPro

glycerol-3-phosphate dehydrogenase 2 (mitochondrial)

Identifiers
- Symbol: GPD2
- NCBI gene: 2820
- HGNC: 4456
- OMIM: 138430
- RefSeq: NM_000408
- UniProt: P43304

Other data
- EC number: 1.1.5.3
- Locus: Chr. 2 q24.1
Search for
- Structures: Swiss-model
- Domains: InterPro

=== GPD1 ===
Cytosolic Glycerol-3-phosphate dehydrogenase (GPD1), is an NAD+-dependent enzyme that reduces dihydroxyacetone phosphate to glycerol-3-phosphate. Simultaneously, NADH is oxidized to NAD+ in the following reaction:

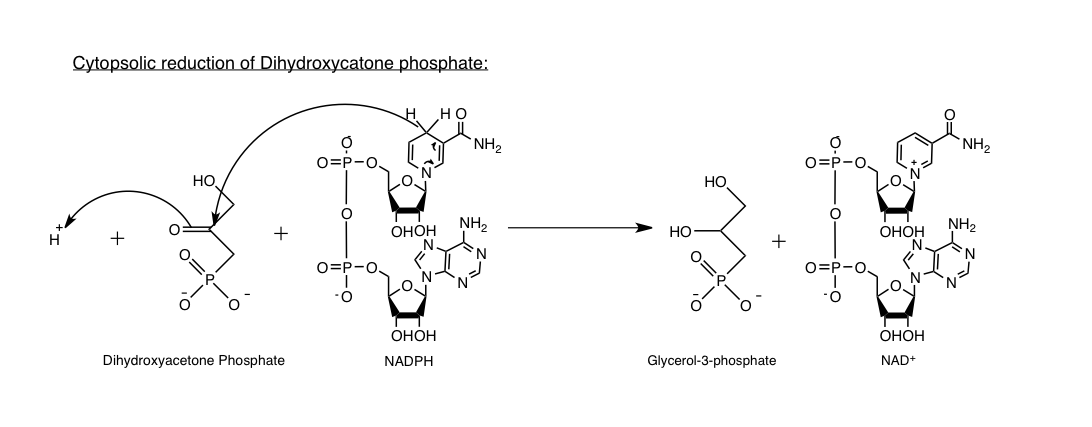
GPD1 Reaction Mechanism

As a result, NAD+ is regenerated for further metabolic activity.

GPD1 consists of two subunits, and reacts with dihydroxyacetone phosphate and NAD+ though the following interaction:

Figure 4. The putative active site. The phosphate group of DHAP is half-encircled by the side-chain of Arg269, and interacts with Arg269 and Gly268 directly by hydrogen bonds (not shown). The conserved residues Lys204, Asn205, Asp260 and Thr264 form a stable hydrogen bonding network. The other hydrogen bonding network includes residues Lys120 and Asp260, as well as an ordered water molecule (with a B-factor of 16.4 Å2), which hydrogen bonds to Gly149 and Asn151 (not shown). In these two electrostatic networks, only the ε-NH_{3}^{+} group of Lys204 is the nearest to the C2 atom of DHAP (3.4 Å).

=== GPD2 ===
Mitochondrial glycerol-3-phosphate dehydrogenase (GPD2), catalyzes the irreversible oxidation of glycerol-3-phosphate to dihydroxyacetone phosphate and concomitantly transfers two electrons from FAD to the electron transport chain. GPD2 consists of 4 identical subunits.

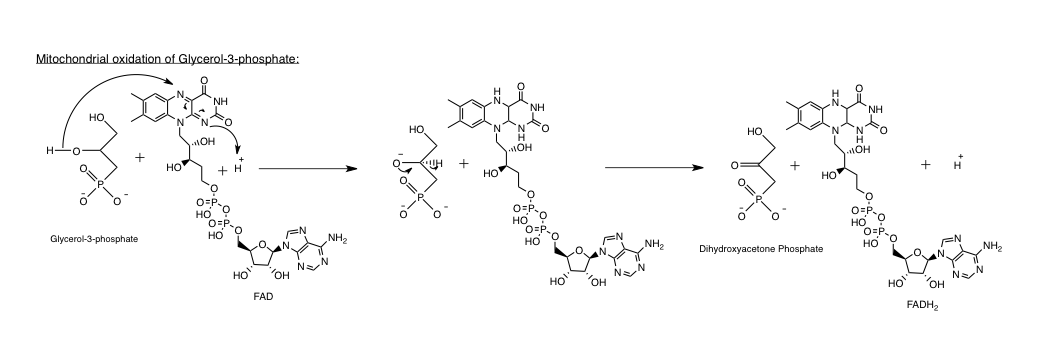
GPD2 Reaction Mechanism

=== Response to environmental stresses ===
- Studies indicate that GPDH is mostly unaffected by pH changes: neither GPD1 or GPD2 is favored under certain pH conditions.
- At high salt concentrations (E.g. NaCl), GPD1 activity is enhanced over GPD2, since an increase in the salinity of the medium leads to an accumulation of glycerol in response.
- Changes in temperature do not appear to favor neither GPD1 nor GPD2.

== Glycerol-3-phosphate shuttle ==
The cytosolic together with the mitochondrial glycerol-3-phosphate dehydrogenase work in concert. Oxidation of cytoplasmic NADH by the cytosolic form of the enzyme creates glycerol-3-phosphate from dihydroxyacetone phosphate. Once the glycerol-3-phosphate has moved through the outer mitochondrial membrane it can then be oxidised by a separate isoform of glycerol-3-phosphate dehydrogenase that uses quinone as an oxidant and FAD as a co-factor. As a result, there is a net loss in energy, comparable to one molecule of ATP.

The combined action of these enzymes maintains the NAD+/NADH ratio that allows for continuous operation of metabolism.

== Role in disease ==
The fundamental role of GPDH in maintaining the NAD+/NADH potential, as well as its role in lipid metabolism, makes GPDH a factor in lipid imbalance diseases, such as obesity.

- Enhanced GPDH activity, particularly GPD2, leads to an increase in glycerol production. Since glycerol is a main subunit in lipid metabolism, its abundance can easily lead to an increase in triglyceride accumulation at a cellular level. As a result, there is a tendency to form adipose tissue leading to an accumulation of fat that favors obesity.
- GPDH has also been found to play a role in Brugada syndrome. Mutations in the gene encoding GPD1 have been proven to cause defects in the electron transport chain. This conflict with NAD+/NADH levels in the cell is believed to contribute to defects in cardiac sodium ion channel regulation and can lead to a lethal arrhythmia during infancy.

== Pharmacological target ==
The mitochondrial isoform of G3P dehydrogenase is thought to be inhibited by metformin, a first line drug for type 2 diabetes.

=== Biological Research ===
Sarcophaga barbata was used to study the oxidation of L-3-glycerophosphate in mitochondria. It is found that the L-3-glycerophosphate does not enter the mitochondrial matrix, unlike pyruvate. This helps locate the L-3-glycerophosphate-flavoprotein oxidoreductase, which is on the inner membrane of the mitochondria.

== Structure ==
Glycerol-3-phosphate dehydrogenase consists of two protein domains. The N-terminal domain is an NAD-binding domain, and the C-terminus acts as a substrate-binding domain. However, dimer and tetramer interface residues are involved in GAPDH-RNA binding, as GAPDH can exhibit several moonlighting activities, including the modulation of RNA binding and/or stability.

== See also ==
- substrate pages: glycerol 3-phosphate, dihydroxyacetone phosphate
- related topics: glycerol phosphate shuttle, creatine kinase, glycolysis, gluconeogenesis
