= Dihydroxyacetone =

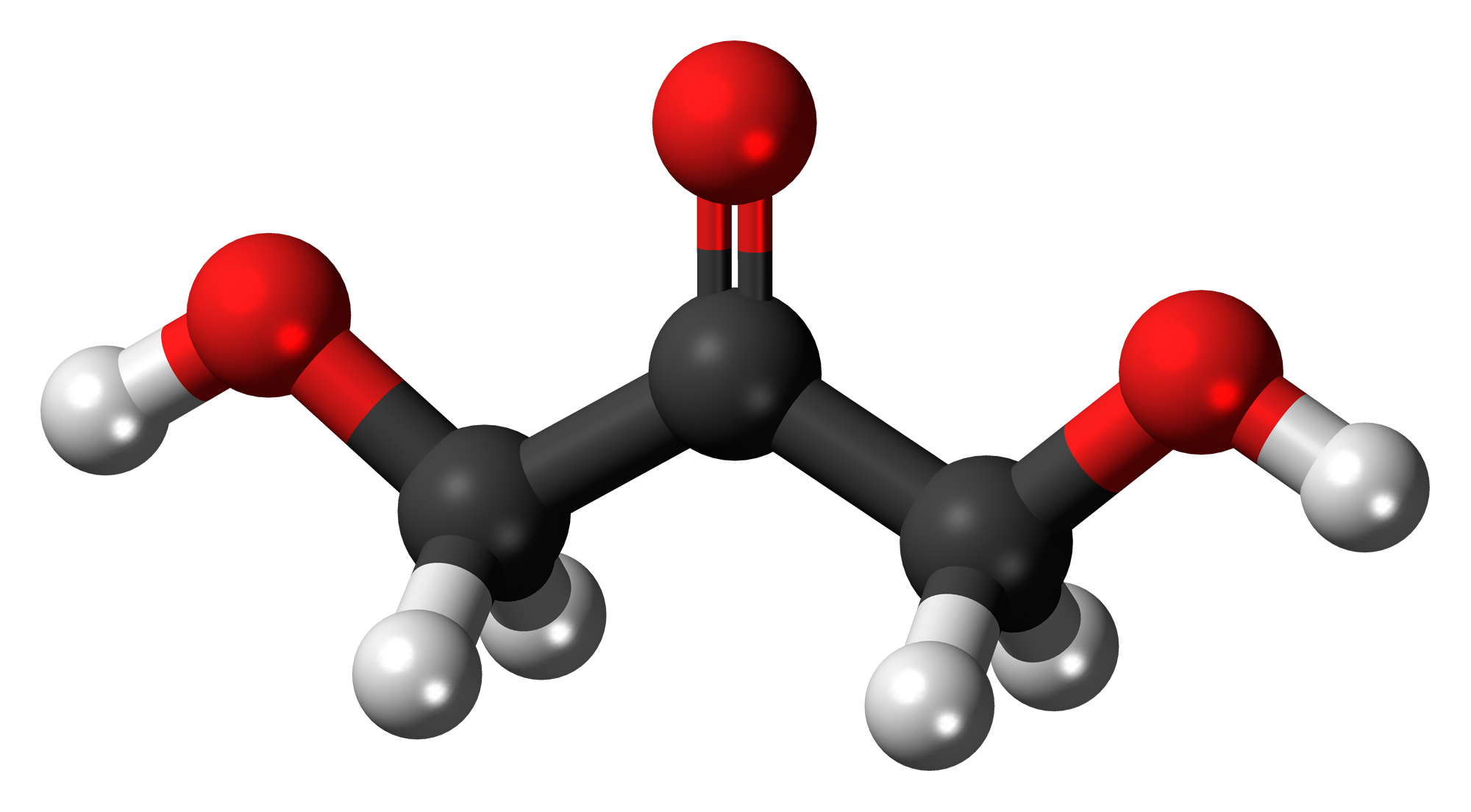

Names
- Preferred IUPAC name 1,3-Dihydroxypropan-2-one
- Other names 1,3-Dihydroxypropanone; Dihydroxyacetone; DHA; Glycerone; Ketochromin

Identifiers
CAS Number	96-26-4
3D model (JSmol)	Interactive image
ChEBI	CHEBI:16016
ChEMBL	ChEMBL1229937
ChemSpider	650
DrugBank	DB01775
ECHA InfoCard	100.002.268
EC Number	202-494-5
KEGG	D07841
PubChem CID	670
UNII	O10DDW6JOO
CompTox Dashboard (EPA)	DTXSID0025072
- InChI: InChI=1S/C3H6O3/c4-1-3(6)2-5/h4-5H,1-2H2 Key: RXKJFZQQPQGTFL-UHFFFAOYSA-N; InChI=1/C3H6O3/c4-1-3(6)2-5/h4-5H,1-2H2 Key: RXKJFZQQPQGTFL-UHFFFAOYAE
- SMILES: O=C(CO)CO

Properties
Chemical formula	C_{3}H_{6}O_{3}
Molar mass	90.078 g·mol^{−1}
Melting point	89 to 91 °C (192 to 196 °F; 362 to 364 K)

Hazards
- GHS labelling
Pictograms	
Signal word	Warning
Hazard statements	H319
Precautionary statements	P264, P280, P305+P351+P338, P337+P313
- Except where otherwise noted, data are given for materials in their standard state (at 25 °C [77 °F], 100 kPa). verify (what is ?) Infobox references

Dihydroxyacetone (/ˌdaɪhaɪˌdrɒksiˈæsɪtoʊn/; DHA), also known as glycerone, is a simple saccharide (a triose) with formula C_{3}H_{6}O_{3}.

DHA is primarily used as an ingredient in sunless tanning products. It is often derived from plant sources such as sugar beets and sugar cane, and by the fermentation of glycerin.

== Chemistry ==
DHA is a hygroscopic white crystalline powder. It has a sweet cooling taste and a characteristic odor. It is the simplest of all ketoses and has no chiral center. The normal form is a dimer (2,5-bis(hydroxymethyl)-1,4-dioxane-2,5-diol). The dimer slowly dissolves in water, whereupon it converts to the monomer. These solutions are stable at pH's between 4 and 6. In more basic solution, it degrades into brown product.

Topical application of DHA causes a skin browning effect attributed to a Maillard reaction. DHA condenses with the amino acid residues in the protein keratin, the major component of the skin surface. When injected, no pigmentation occurs, consistent with a role for oxygen in color development. The resulting pigments, which can be removed by abrasion, are called melanoidins. These are similar in coloration to melanin, the natural substance in the deeper skin layers which brown or "tan" from exposure to UV rays.

== Biochemistry ==
Its phosphorylated form, dihydroxyacetone phosphate (DHAP), takes part in glycolysis, and it is an intermediate product of fructose metabolism.

== Preparation ==
DHA may be prepared, along with glyceraldehyde, by the mild oxidation of glycerol, for example with hydrogen peroxide and a ferrous salt as catalyst. It can also be prepared in high yield and selectivity at room temperature from glycerol using cationic palladium-based catalysts with oxygen, air or benzoquinone acting as co-oxidants. Glyceraldehyde is a structural isomer of dihydroxyacetone.

DHA can be derived from plants.

== Sunless tanning ==
DHA is the main active ingredient in many sunless tanning skincare preparations, which may be classified as topical sunless tanner or temporary bronzers. As opposed to bronzers containing pigment to coat the skin, DHA bronzers cause a coloration of the surface layer of the skin and do not wash off easily. Current sunless tanners are formulated into sprays, lotions, gels, mousses, and cosmetic wipes. Professional applied products include spray tanning booths, airbrush tan applications, and hand applied lotions, gels, mousses and wipes. Lotions often last longer than sprays but may cause blotching and streaking. Mousses and gels tend to dry faster. Mousses generally contain less moisture.

Lotion manufacturers also produce a wide variety of sunless tanning preparations that replace DHA with natural bronzing agents such as black walnut shell. DHA may be used alone or combined with other tanning components such as erythrulose. DHA is considered the most effective sun-free tanning additive.

Sunless tanning products contain DHA in concentrations ranging from 1% to 20%. Most drugstore products range from 3% to 5%, with professional products ranging from 5% to 20%. The percentages correspond with the product coloration levels from light to dark. Lighter products are more beginner-friendly, but may require multiple coats to produce the desired color depth. Darker products produce a dark tan in one coat, but are also more prone to streaking, unevenness, or off-color tones. The artificial tan takes 2 to 4 hours to begin appearing on the skin surface, and will continue to darken for 24 to 72 hours, depending on formulation type.

Once the darkening effect has occurred, the tan will not sweat off or wash away with soap or water. It will fade gradually over 3 to 7 days as a result of the regular skin exfoliation. Scrubbing the skin, prolonged water submersion, or heavy sweating can lighten the tan, as these all contribute to rapid dead skin cell exfoliation (the dead skin cells are the tinted portion of the sunless tan).

It is recommended to shave, wash, or exfoliate the skin before application in order to produce a more even tan. The skin should not be moisturized before application except very dry areas. Application should be done evenly with a circular motion.

Bronzers contain DHA in concentrations from 1 to 15% allowing to adjust the intensity of coloration. DHA formulations have improved in several ways since the introduction in the 1960s.

=== Safe use and side effects ===
The United States Food and Drug Administration (FDA) has approved DHA for topical application on the skin, but not for contact with eyes, lips, and mucous membranes. DHA may not be used in spray tanning booths due to risk of exposure of these sensitive areas.

DHA-containing spray tans have been associated to side effects such as rashes, cough, dizziness, and fainting. Frequent exposure to spray tans may increase the risk of pulmonary disease, asthma, chronic obstructive pulmonary disease (COPD), and cancer.

The chemical reaction of DHA in the skin may lead to an unpleasant smell. Fragrances are often added to the formulation to mask the smell, which may lead to allergic reactions or worsen asthma symptoms. Some products contain parabens as chemical preservatives that can cause rosacea and allergic contact dermatitis and act as weak estrogens.

Frequent use of DHA containing products may to be problematic due to a number of side effects. A FDA report concluded that 11 percent of the applied DHA may penetrate into the living cells of the epidermis and dermis. A previous study linked DHA to DNA damage, cell-cycle block, and apoptosis in living cells. Skin coloring induced by frequent use of DHA may interfere with vitamin D production in the skin cells which depends on the exposure to UVB in sunlight. Topical DHA use in levels of more than 5% seem to increase free-radical damage from sunlight for 24 hours after application. Antioxidants may be added to the formulation to produce a more natural tan, and may potentially counteract free radical damage. The use of sunless tanning products may increase the likelihood of sunburn as the artificial coloration of the skin interferes with the natural adaption of the skin to sun exposure. The tanning induced by DHA has been rated with a low sun protection factor (SPF) of 3. It can therefore not replace the application of a regular sunscreen before exposing the skin to intensive sunlight.

Erythrulose is a similar agent contained in red raspberries that produces a short-lived reddish tan. The general tanning effect is usually improved when used in combination with DHA. Erythrulose also increases the occurrence of free radicals.

DHA may be contained in moisturizers with added fruit extracts sold as "maximizers". Tanning agents labelled as "tingles" contain benzyl nicotinate which presumably aids the production of melanin by increasing blood circulation in the skin, thus supplying more oxygen to melanocytes, and often induces a burning or tingling feeling. The effect of products called "optimizers" or "accelerators" containing the protein tyrosine as a precursor in the production of melanin is disputed.

=== History ===
DHA was first recognized as a skin coloring agent by German scientists in the 1920s. Through its use in the X-ray process, it was noted as causing the skin surface to turn brown when spilled.

In the 1950s, Eva Wittgenstein at the University of Cincinnati did further research with dihydroxyacetone. Her studies involved using DHA as an oral drug for assisting children with glycogen storage disease. The children received large doses of DHA by mouth, and sometimes spat or spilled the substance onto their skin. Healthcare workers noticed that the skin turned brown after a few hours of DHA exposure. Wittgenstein continued to experiment with DHA, painting liquid solutions of it onto her own skin. She was able to consistently reproduce the pigmentation effect, and noted that DHA did not appear to penetrate beyond the stratum corneum, or dead skin surface layer (the FDA eventually concluded this is not entirely true). Research then continued on DHA's skin coloring effect in relation to treatment for patients with vitiligo.

Coppertone introduced the first consumer sunless tanning lotion into the marketplace in the 1960s. This product was called "Quick Tan" or "QT", and dihydroxyacetone in the formulation was referred to in advertising as "ketochromin". It was sold as an overnight tanning agent, and other companies followed suit with similar products. Consumers soon tired of this product due to unattractive results such as orange palms, streaking and poor coloration. Because of the QT experience, many people still associate sunless tanning with fake-looking orange tans.

In the 1970s the United States Food and Drug Administration (FDA) added DHA permanently to their list of approved cosmetic ingredients.

By the 1980s, new sunless tanning formulations appeared on the market and refinements in the DHA manufacturing process created products that produced a more natural looking color and better fading. Consumer concerns surrounding damage associated with UV tanning options (sunbathing, indoor tanning) spurred popularity of sunless tanning products as an alternative to UV tanning. Dozens of brands appeared on drugstore shelves, in numerous formulations.

== Winemaking ==
Both acetic acid bacteria Acetobacter aceti and Gluconobacter oxydans use glycerol as a carbon source to form dihydroxyacetone. DHA is formed by ketogenesis of glycerol. It can affect the sensory quality of the wine with sweet/etherish properties. DHA can also react with proline to produce a "crust-like" aroma. Dihydroxyacetone can affect the antimicrobial activity in wine, as it has the ability to bind SO_{2}.
