= Glycerol 3-phosphate =

sn-Glycerol 3-phosphate

Names
- Preferred IUPAC name (2R)-2,3-Dihydroxypropyl dihydrogen phosphate
- Other names 1,2,3-propanetriol, 1-(dihydrogen phosphate), (2R)- D-glycerol 1-phosphate L-glycerol 3-phosphate L-α-glycerophosphate; L-α-phosphoglycerol

Identifiers
CAS Number	17989-41-2
3D model (JSmol)	Interactive image
Beilstein Reference	1723975
ChEBI	CHEBI:15978
ChEMBL	ChEMBL1232920
ChemSpider	388308
DrugBank	DB02515
ECHA InfoCard	100.000.279
EC Number	200-307-1
KEGG	C00093
MeSH	Alpha-glycerophosphoric+acid
PubChem CID	439162
UNII	370V52HE4B
CompTox Dashboard (EPA)	DTXSID6023105
- InChI: InChI=1S/C3H9O6P/c4-1-3(5)2-9-10(6,7)8/h3-5H,1-2H2,(H2,6,7,8)/t3-/m1/s1 Key: AWUCVROLDVIAJX-GSVOUGTGSA-N
- SMILES: C([C@H](COP(=O)(O)O)O)O

Properties
Chemical formula	C_{3}H_{7}O_{6}P
Molar mass	170.057 g·mol^{−1}

Related compounds
Related organophosphates	Glycerol 1-phosphate Glycerol 2-phosphate
- Except where otherwise noted, data are given for materials in their standard state (at 25 °C [77 °F], 100 kPa). verify (what is ?) Infobox references

sn-Glycerol 3-phosphate (Note: This article uses stereospecific numbering where stereoconfiguration is not explicitly specified.) (Note: Equally appropriate names in biochemical context include glycerol-3-phosphate, 3-O-phosphonoglycerol, 3-phosphoglycerol and Gro3P.) is the organic ion with the formula HOCH_{2}CH(OH)CH_{2}OPO_{3}^{2-}. It is one of two stereoisomers of the ester of dibasic phosphoric acid (HOPO_{3}^{2-}) and glycerol. It is a component of bacterial and eukaryotic glycerophospholipids. From a historical reason, it is also known as L-glycerol 3-phosphate, D-glycerol 1-phosphate, L-α-glycerophosphoric acid.

== Biosynthesis ==
Glycerol 3-phosphate is synthesized by reducing dihydroxyacetone phosphate (DHAP), an intermediate in glycolysis. The reduction is catalyzed by glycerol-3-phosphate dehydrogenase. DHAP and thus glycerol 3-phosphate can also be synthesized from amino acids and citric acid cycle intermediates via the glyceroneogenesis pathway.

+ NAD(P)H + H^{+} → + NAD(P)^{+}

It is also synthesized by the phosphorylation of glycerol, which is generated by hydrolysis of fats. This esterification is catalyzed by glycerol kinase.

+ ATP → + ADP

== Metabolism and biological function ==
Glycerophospholipids have three components: fatty acid lipid groups (orange), glycerol backbone (white), and 3-phosphate ester (green)

Glycerol 3-phosphate is a starting material for de novo synthesis of glycerolipids. In eukaryotes, it is first acylated on its sn-1 position by an ER- or mitochondrial membrane enzyme, glycerol-3-phosphate O-acyltransferase. A second acyl group is subsequently installed on the sn-2 position making phosphatidic acids.

+ Acyl-CoA → Lysophosphatidic acid + CoA

Glycerol-1-phosphatase catalyzes the hydrolysis of glycerol 3-phosphate to regenerate glycerol, allowing glycerol fermentation to produce glycerol from glucose through glycolysis pathway. A number of organisms express this enzyme.

+ H_{2}O → + Pi

== Shuttle system ==
Glycerol-3-phosphate dehydrogenases are located both in the cytosol and the intermembrane face of mitochondrial inner membrane. Glycerol 3-phosphate (G3P) and dihydroxyacetone phosphate (DHAP) are molecules so small that they can permeate the mitochondrial outer membrane through porins and shuttle between two dehydrogenases. Using this shuttle system, NADH generated by cytosolic metabolisms including glycolysis is reoxidized to NAD^{+} reducing DHAP to G3P, and the reducing equivalent can be used for generating a proton gradient across the mitochondrial inner membrane by coupling and oxidizing G3P and reducing quinone.

The Glycerol 3-phosphate shuttle is an emergency back-up system to supply neurons' demand of energy.

== Dephosphorylation ==
Glycerol-3-phosphate was found to be a substrate for the enzyme phosphoglycolate phosphatase (PGP, or G3PP) in mammals in 2015. G3PP activity has subsequently been suggested to have a regulatory role in central metabolism and stress response.

== Glycerol 1-phosphate ==
Glycerol 1-phosphate, sometimes called as D-glycerol 3-phosphate, is the enantiomer of glycerol 3-phosphate. Eukaryotes use the 3-phosphate, or L-configuration, for glycerolipid backbone. The 1-phosphate is specifically found in archaeal lipids.

== See also ==
- Glycerol 2-phosphate
