= List of sugars =

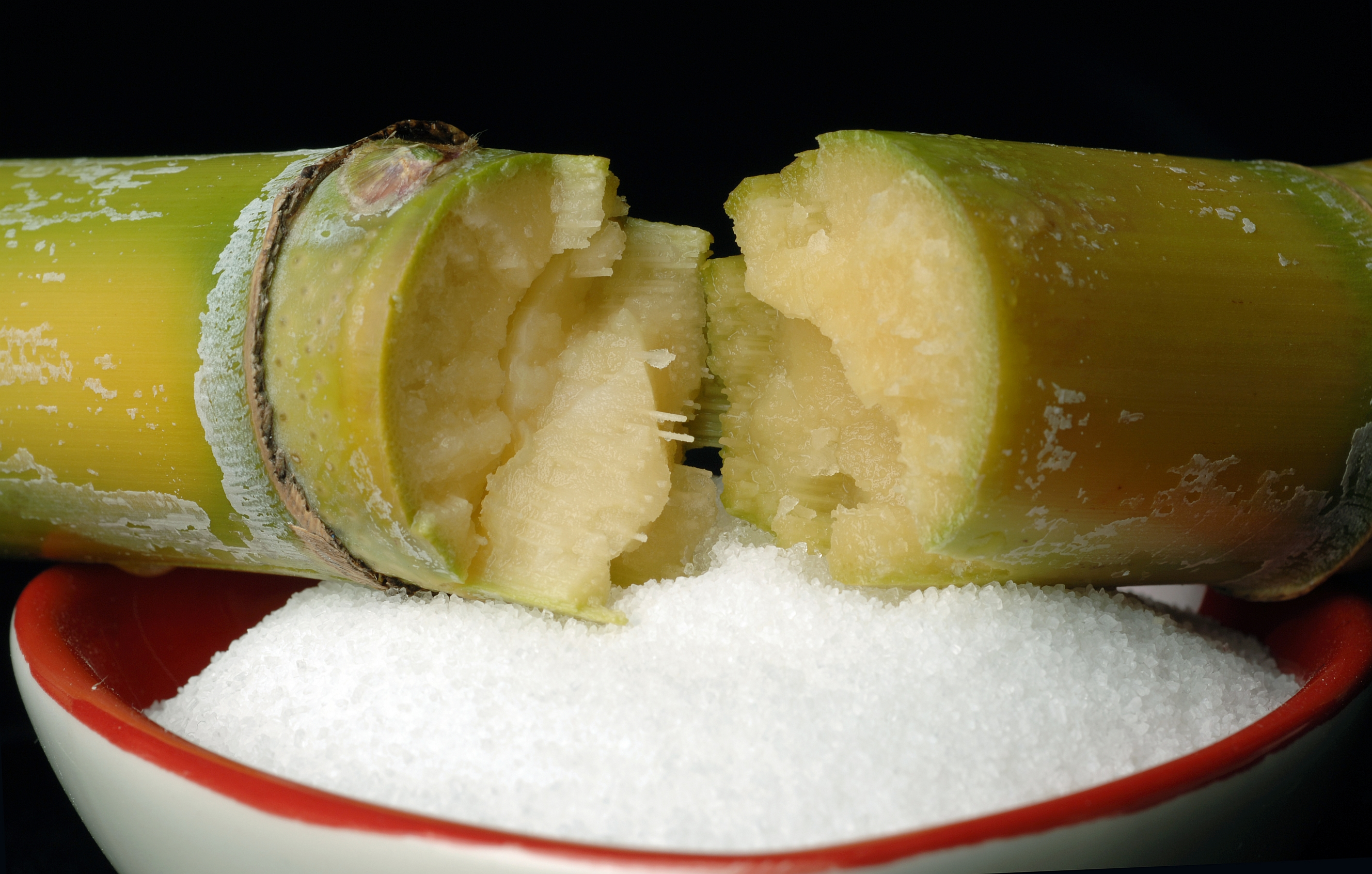
Sugarcane and bowl of sugar

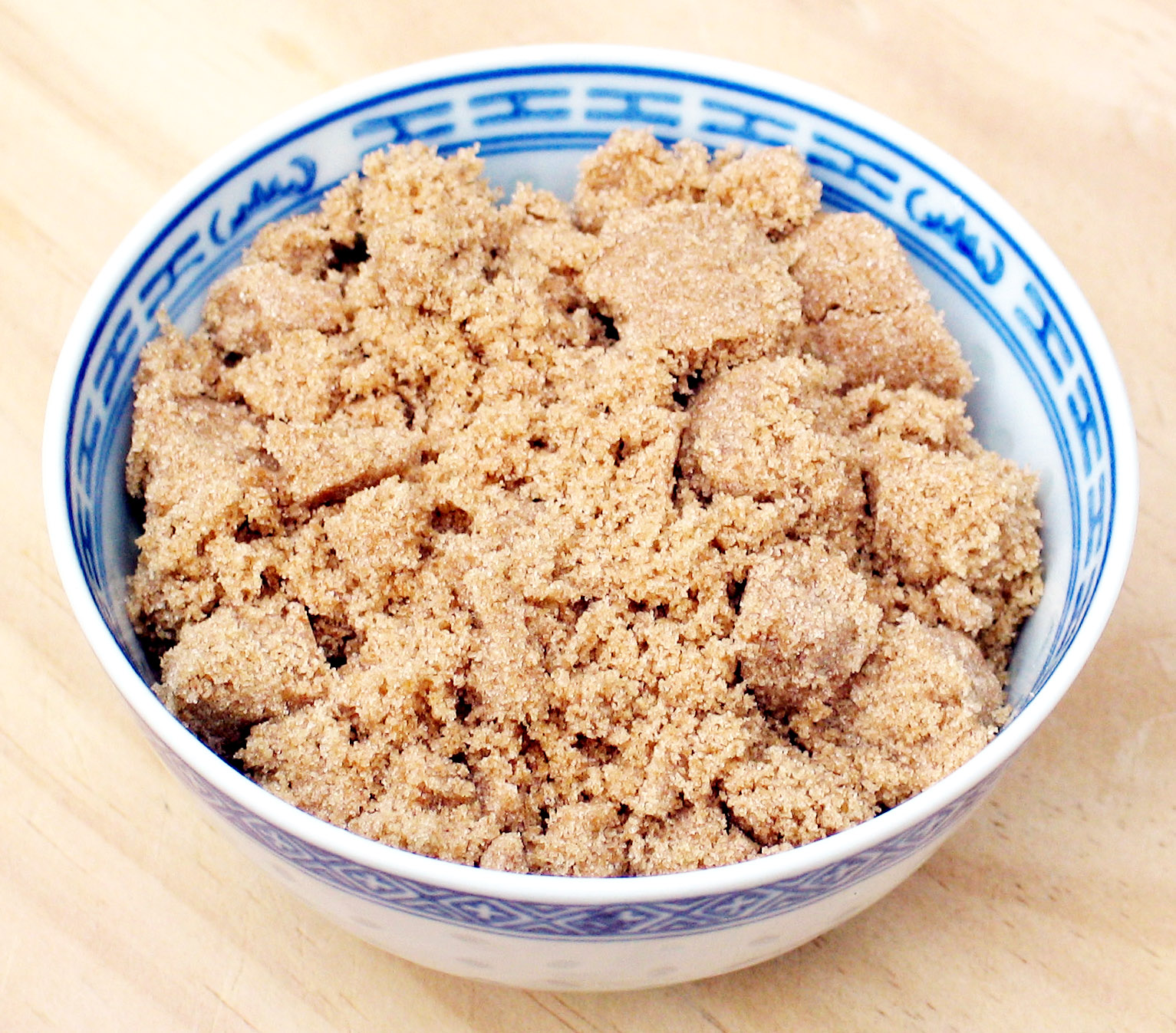
Brown sugar

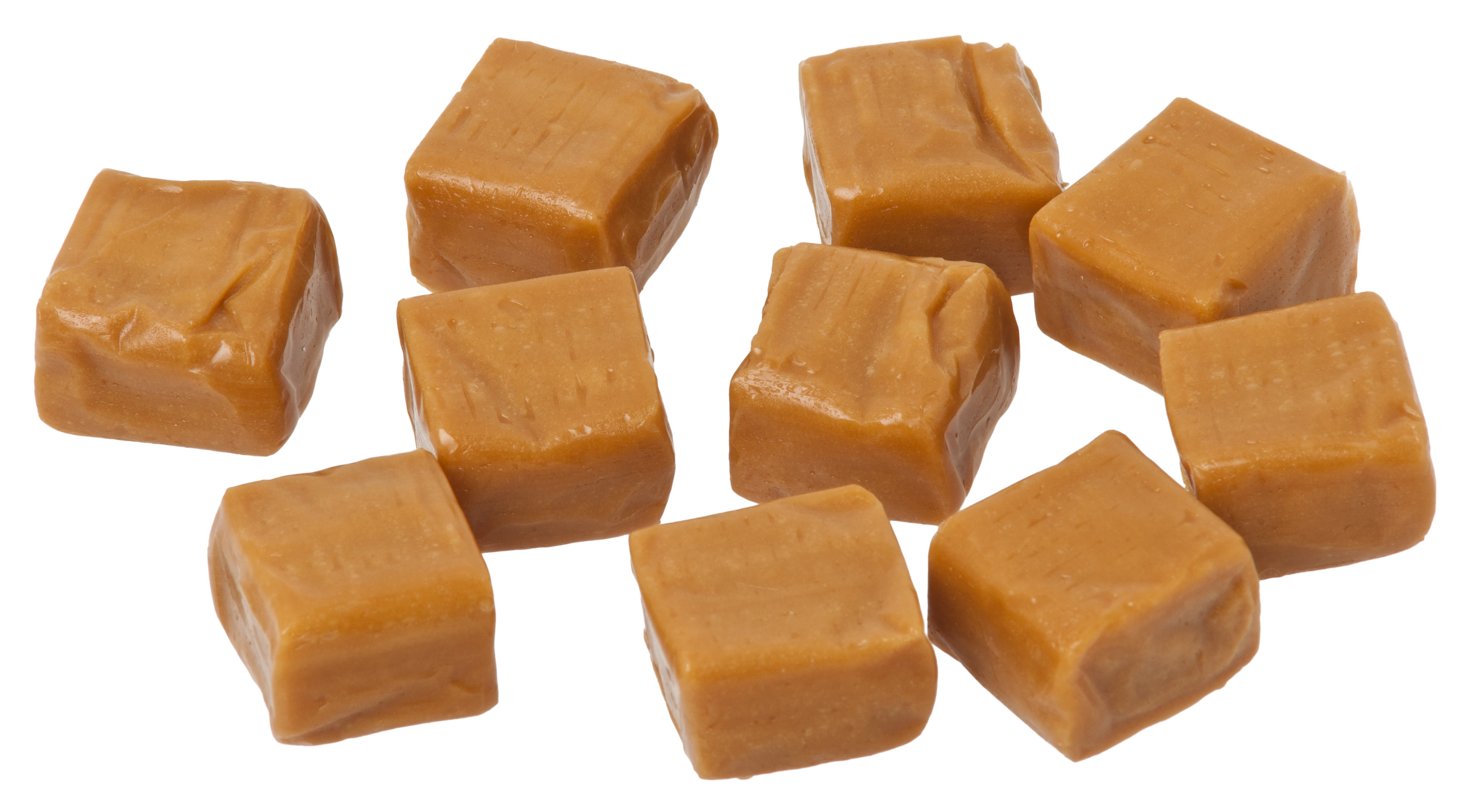
Milk caramel manufactured as square candies, either for eating or for melting down

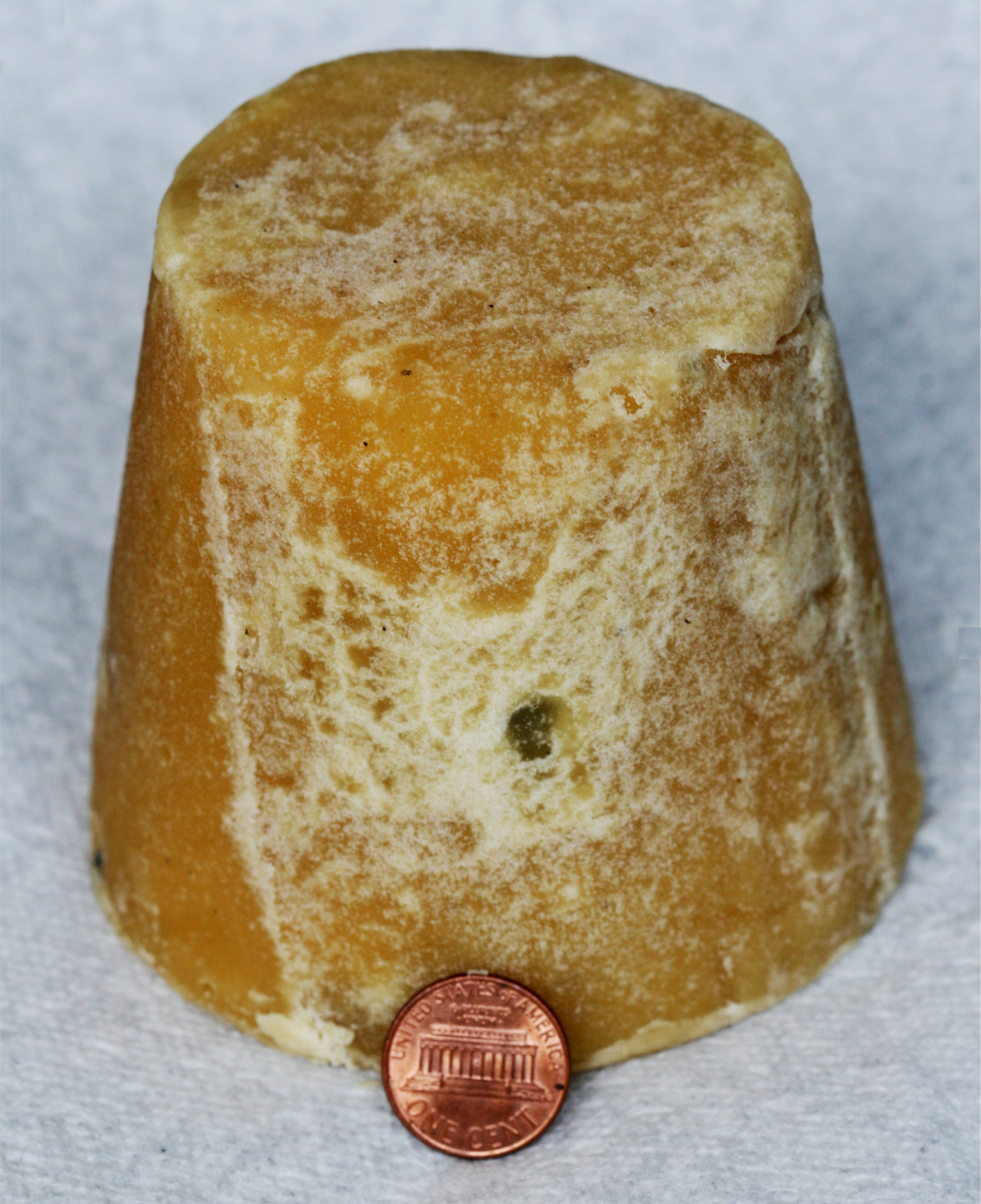
A block of Indian jaggery

The following is a non-exhaustive list of sugars, also called carbohydrates or saccharides.

Monosaccharides consist of a single sugar molecule, disaccharides consist of two sugar molecules.

Monosaccharides are further divided into dioses, trioses, tetroses, and so on, depending on their number of carbon atoms. Most common sugars are either pentoses (five carbons) or hexoses (six carbons).

Polymers containing three to ten sugars are typically considered oligosaccharides. Polymers of more than ten sugars are called polysaccharides.

Sugars are further grouped into either aldoses or ketoses, as well as furanoses or pyranoses, depending on their structure.

== Monosaccharides ==
- Arabinose
- Allose
- Altrose
- Dihydroxyacetone (also called glycerone)
- Erythrose
- Erythrulose
- Fructose (also called levulose)
- Fucose
- Fuculose
- Glycoaldehyde
- Glyceraldehyde
- Galactose
- Glucose (also called dextrose)
- Gulose
- Idose
- Lyxose
- Mannose
- Mannoheptulose
- Psicose (also called allulose)
- Ribose
- Ribulose
- Rhamnose
- Sorbose
- Sedoheptulose
- Talose
- Tagatose
- Xylose
- Xylulose

== Disaccharides ==
- Disaccharides
- Lactose
- Trehalose
- Turanose
- Maltose
- Neohesperidose
- Robinose
- Rutinose
- Sucrose (also called white sugar, granulated sugar, or table sugar)

== Oligosaccharides ==
- Acarbose
- Fructo-Oligosaccharide
- Galacto-Oligosaccharide
- Isomalto-Oligosaccharide
- Maltodextrin
- Maltotriose
- Melezitose
- Raffinose (also called melitose)
- Stachyose

== Polysaccharides ==
- Cellulose
- Chitin
- Chitosan
- Dextrin
- Dextran
- Galactan
- Glycogen
- Glycosaminoglycan
- Galactomannan
- Glucomannan
- Guar gum
- Hemicellulose
- Inulin
- Levan
- Lentinan
- Lignin
- Lichenin
- Oat beta-glucan
- Pectin
- Schizophyllan (also called sizofiran)
- Starch (composed of amylose and amylopectin)
- Xanthan gum
- Zymosan

== See also ==
- Alpha-glucan
- Beta-glucan
- Deoxy sugar
- Glucan
- Glycolipid
- Glycoprotein
- Heptoses
- Mannan
- Nonoses
- Octoses
- Sugar alcohol
- Sugar acid
