= Monosaccharide nomenclature =

Naming system for building blocks of carbohydrate

Monosaccharide nomenclature is the naming system of the building blocks of carbohydrates, the monosaccharides, which may be monomers or part of a larger polymer. Monosaccharides are subunits that cannot be further hydrolysed in to simpler units. Depending on the number of carbon atom they are further classified into trioses, tetroses, pentoses, hexoses etc., which is further classified in to aldoses and ketoses depending on the type of functional group present in them.

== Systematic name of molecular graph ==
The elementary formula of a simple monosaccharide is C_{n}H_{2n}O_{n}, where the integer n is at least 3 and rarely greater than 7. Simple monosaccharides may be named generically based on the number of carbon atoms n: trioses, tetroses, pentoses, hexoses, etc.

Every simple monosaccharide has an acyclic (open chain) form, which can be written as $\ce{H-(CH(OH))_\mathit{x}-(C=O)-(CH(OH))_\mathit{y}-H}$; that is, a straight chain of carbon atoms, one of which is a carbonyl group, all the others bearing a hydrogen -H and a hydroxyl -OH each, with one extra hydrogen at either end. The carbons of the chain are conventionally numbered from 1 to n, starting from the end which is closest to the carbonyl.

If the carbonyl is at the very beginning of the chain (carbon 1), the monosaccharide is said to be an aldose, otherwise it is a ketose. These names can be combined with the chain length prefix, as in aldohexose or ketopentose. Most ketoses found in nature have the carbonyl in position 2; when that is not the case, one uses a numeric prefix to indicate the carbonyl's position. Thus for example, aldohexose means H(C=O)(CHOH)_{5}H, ketopentose means H(CHOH)(C=O)(CHOH)_{3}H, and 3-ketopentose means H(CHOH)_{2}(C=O)(CHOH)_{2}H.

An alternative nomenclature uses the suffix '-ose' only for aldoses, and '-ulose' for ketoses. The position of the carbonyl (when it is not 1 or 2) is indicated by a numerical infix. For example, hexose in this nomenclature means H(C=O)(CHOH)_{5}H, pentulose means H(CHOH)(C=O)(CHOH)_{3}H, and hexa-3-ulose means H(CHOH)_{2}(C=O)(CHOH)_{3}H.

== Naming of acyclic stereoisomers ==
Open-chain monosaccharides with same molecular graph may exist as two or more stereoisomers. The Fischer projection is a systematic way of drawing the skeletal formula of an open-chain monosaccharide so that each stereoisomer is uniquely identified.

Two isomers whose molecules are mirror-images of each other are identified by prefixes 'D-' or 'L-', according to the handedness of the chiral carbon atom that is farthest from the carbonyl. In the Fischer projection, that is the second carbon from the bottom; the prefix is 'D-' or 'L-' according to whether the hydroxyl on that carbon lies to the right or left of the backbone, respectively.

If the molecular graph is symmetrical (H(CHOH)_{x}(CO)(CHOH)_{x}H) and the two halves are mirror images of each other, then the molecule is identical to its mirror image, and there is no 'L-' form.

A distinct common name, such as "glucose" or "ribose", is traditionally assigned to each pair of mirror-image stereoisomers, and to each achiral stereoisomer. These names have standard three-letter abbreviations, such as 'Glc' for glucose and 'Rib' for ribose.

Another nomenclature uses the systematic name of the molecular graph, a 'D-' or 'L-' prefix to indicate the position of the last chiral hydroxyl on the Fischer diagram (as above), and another italic prefix to indicate the positions of the remaining hydroxyls relative to the first one, read from bottom to top in the diagram, skipping the keto group if any. These prefixes are attached to the systematic name of the molecular graph. So for example, D-glucose is D-gluco-hexose, D-ribose is D-ribo-pentose, and D-psicose is D-ribo-hexulose. Note that, in this nomenclature, mirror-image isomers differ only in the 'D'/'L' prefix, even though all their hydroxyls are reversed.

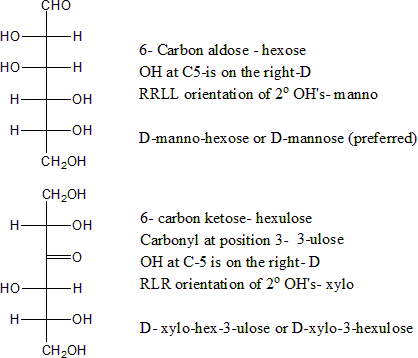

The following tables shows the Fischer projections of selected monosaccharides (in open-chain form), with their conventional names. The table shows all aldoses with 3 to 6 carbon atoms, and a few ketoses. For chiral molecules, only the 'D-' form (with the next-to-last hydroxyl on the right side) is shown; the corresponding forms have mirror-image structures. Some of these monosaccharides are only synthetically prepared in the laboratory and not found in nature.

=== Names of aldoses ===
Aldotrioses; Trioses	D-Glyceraldehyde							
Aldotetroses; Tetroses	D-Erythrose erythro- Ery				D-Threose threo- Tho			
Aldopentoses; Pentoses	D-Ribose ribo- Rib		D-Arabinose arabino- Ara		D-Xylose xylo- Xyl		D-Lyxose lyxo- Lyx	
Aldohexoses; Hexoses	D-Allose allo- All	D-Altrose altro- Alt	D-Glucose gluco- Glc	D-Mannose manno- Man	D-Gulose gulo- Gul	D-Idose ido- Ido	D-Galactose galacto- Gal	D-Talose talo- Tal

=== Names of ketoses ===
Ketotrioses; Triuloses	Glycerone			
Ketotetrose; Tetruloses	D-Erythrulose erythrulo-			
Ketopentoses; Pentuloses	D-Ribulose ribulo- Rul		D-Xylulose xylulo- Xul	
Ketohexoses; Hexuloses	D-Psicose psico- Psi	D-Fructose fructo- Fru	D-Sorbose sorbo- Sor	D-Tagatose tagato- Tag

=== Names of 3-ketoses ===
3-Ketopentoses; Penta-3-uloses	SYM-3-Ketopentose				D-UNS-3-Ketopentose			
3-Ketohexoses; Hexa-3-uloses	D-RRR-3-Ketohexose	D-RRL-3-Ketohexose	D-RLR-3-Ketohexose	D-RLL-3-Ketohexose	D-LRR-3-Ketohexose	D-LRL-3-Ketohexose	D-LLR-3-Ketohexose	D-LLL-3-Ketohexose

== Cyclic forms ==
For monosaccharides in their cyclic form, an infix is placed before the '-ose', '-ulose', or 'n-ulose' suffix to specify the ring size. The infix is "furan" for a 5-atom ring, "pyran" for 6, "septan" for 7, and so on.

Ring closure creates another chiral center at the anomeric carbon (the one with the hemiacetal or acetal functionality), and therefore each open-chain stereoisomer gives rise to two distinct stereoisomers (anomers). These are identified by the prefixes 'α-' and 'β-', which denote the relative configuration of the anomeric carbon to that of the stereocenter at the other end of the carbon chain. If the conformation (R or S) is identical at both the anomeric carbon and the most distant stereocenter, the configuration is 'α-'. If the conformations are different, the configuration is 'β-'

Examples

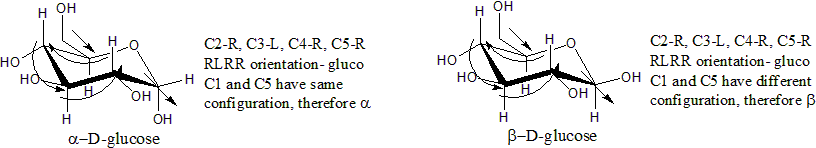

== Glycosides ==
Glycosides are saccharides in which the hydroxyl -OH at the anomeric centre is replaced by an oxygen-bridged group -OR. The carbohydrate part of the molecule is called glycone, the -O- bridge is the glycosisdic oxygen, and the attached group is the aglycone. Glycosides are named by giving the aglyconic alcohol HOR, followed by the saccharide name with the '-e' ending replaced by '-ide'; as in phenol D-glucopyranoside.

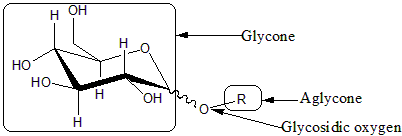

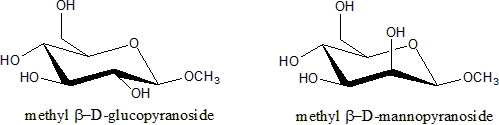

== Modified sugars ==
Modification of sugar is generally done by replacing one or more –OH group with other functional groups at all positions except C-1.

Rules for nomenclature of modified sugars:

- State if the sugar is a deoxy sugar, which means the –OH group is replaced by H.
- Specify the position of deoxygenation.
- If there is a substituent other than H in the place of –OH, specify what it is.
- Specify the relative configuration of all stereogenic centres (manno, gluco etc.).
- Specify the ring size (furanose, pyranose etc.) and anomeric configuration (a or b).
- State the chain length only in situation where –OH is replaced with H.
- Alphabetize all the substituent groups (deoxy, -iodo, -amino etc.). Di-, tri- etc. prefixes do not count.

Examples

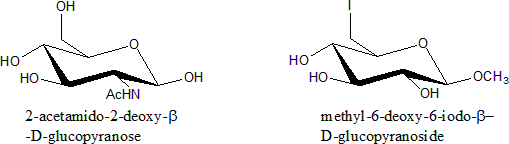

=== Protected sugars ===
Sugars in which –OH is protected by some modification are called protected sugars.

Rules for nomenclature for protected sugars:

- Specify the number of particular protecting groups (di, tri, tetra etc.).
- List groups alphabetically along with all other substituents (di, tri prefixes do not count).

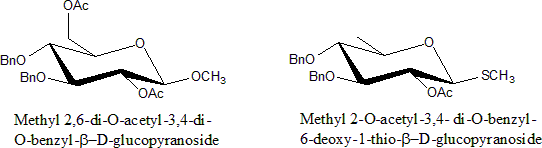

== See also ==
- Carbohydrate conformation
- Symbol Nomenclature For Glycans
- Polysaccharide
- Oligosaccharide
- Oligosaccharide nomenclature
- List of sugars
