= C6H12O6 =

The molecular formula C_{6}H_{12}O_{6} (molar mass: 180.16 g/mol) may refer to:

- Hexoses
  - Aldohexoses
    - Allose
    - Altrose
    - Galactose
    - Glucose
      - Dextrose (D-Glucose)
      - L-Glucose
    - Gulose
    - Idose
    - Mannose
    - Talose
  - Ketohexoses
    - Fructose
    - Psicose
    - Sorbose
    - Tagatose
- Isosaccharinic acid
- Inositols
  - allo-Inositol
  - cis-Inositol
  - chiro-Inositol (1R-chiro-Inositol)
    - 1D-chiro-Inositol
    - 1L-chiro-Inositol
  - epi-Inositol
  - muco-Inositol
  - neo-Inositol
  - scyllo-Inositol
