= Le Bel–Van 't Hoff rule =

Rule regarding the number of stereoisomers of an organic compound

In organic chemistry, the Le Bel–Van 't Hoff rule states that the number of stereoisomers of an organic compound containing no internal planes of symmetry is 2^{n}, where n represents the number of asymmetric carbon atoms. French chemist Joseph Achille Le Bel and Dutch chemist Jacobus Henricus van 't Hoff both announced this hypothesis in 1874 and that this accounted for all molecular asymmetry known at the time.

As an example, four of the carbon atoms of the aldohexose class of molecules are asymmetric, therefore the Le Bel–Van 't Hoff rule gives a calculation of 2^{4} = 16 stereoisomers. This is indeed the case: these chemicals are two enantiomers each of eight different diastereomers: allose, altrose, glucose, mannose, gulose, idose, galactose, and talose.

Four asymmetric carbon atoms in glucose (the four carbon–oxygen bonds marked in red)
