= Ketose =

Monosaccharides with one >C=O group per molecule

Fructose, an example of a ketose. The ketone group is the double- bonded oxygen.

In organic chemistry, a ketose is a monosaccharide containing one ketone (>C=O) group per molecule. The simplest ketose is dihydroxyacetone ((CH_{2}OH)_{2}C=O), which has only three carbon atoms. It is the only ketose with no optical activity. All monosaccharide ketoses are reducing sugars, because they can tautomerize into aldoses via an enediol intermediate, and the resulting aldehyde group can be oxidised, for example in the Tollens' test or Benedict's test. Ketoses that are bound into glycosides, for example in the case of the fructose moiety of sucrose, are nonreducing sugars.

== Chemistry ==
Ketoses and aldoses can be chemically differentiated through Seliwanoff's test, where the sample is heated with acid and resorcinol. The test relies on the dehydration reaction which occurs more quickly in ketoses, so that while aldoses react slowly, producing a light pink color, ketoses react more quickly and strongly to produce a dark red color. Ketoses can isomerize to aldoses through the Lobry-de Bruyn-van Ekenstein transformation.

== Examples of ketoses ==
Family tree of D-ketoses up to hexoses: dihydroxyacetone (1); D-erythrulose (2); D-ribulose (3a); D-xylulose (3b); D-psicose (4a); D-fructose (4b); D-sorbose (4c); D-tagatose (4d)

All ketoses listed here are 2-ketoses, in other words, the carbonyl group is on the second carbon atom from the end:

- Trioses: dihydroxyacetone
- Tetroses: erythrulose
- Pentoses: ribulose, xylulose
- Hexoses: fructose, psicose, sorbose, tagatose
- Heptoses: sedoheptulose
- Octoses: D-manno-octulose (the basis for KDO)
- Nonoses: D-glycero-D-galacto-nonulose (the basis for neuraminic acid)
