= Glycopeptide =

Type of peptides

Glycopeptides are peptides that contain carbohydrate moieties (glycans) covalently attached to the side chains of the amino acid residues that constitute the peptide.

Over the past few decades it has been recognised that glycans on cell surface (attached to membrane proteins or lipids) and those bound to proteins (glycoproteins) play a critical role in biology. For example, these constructs have been shown to play important roles in fertilization, the immune system, brain development, the endocrine system, and inflammation.

The synthesis of glycopeptides provides biological probes for researchers to elucidate glycan function in nature and products that have useful therapeutic and biotechnological applications.

== Glycopeptide linkage variety ==
=== N-Linked glycans ===
N-Linked glycans derive their name from the fact that the glycan is attached to an asparagine (Asn, N) residue, and are amongst the most common linkages found in nature. Although the majority of N-linked glycans take the form GlcNAc-β-Asn other less common structural linkages such as GlcNac-α-Asn and Glc-Asn have been observed. In addition to their function in protein folding and cellular attachment, the N-liked glycans of a protein can modulate the protein's function, in some cases acting as an on-off switch.

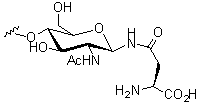
GlcNAc-β-Asn

=== O-Linked glycans ===
O-Linked glycans are formed by a linkage between an amino acid hydroxyl side chain (usually from serine or threonine) with the glycan. The majority of O-linked glycans take the form GlcNac-β-Ser/Thr or GalNac-α-Ser/Thr.

GlcNac-β-Ser

=== C-Linked glycans ===
Of the three linkages the least common and least understood are C-linked glycans. The C-linkage refers to the covalent attachment of mannose to a tryptophan residue. An example of a C-linked glycan is α-mannosyl tryptophan.

== Glycopeptide synthesis ==
Several methods have been reported in the literature for the synthesis of glycopeptides. Of these methods the most common strategies are listed below.

=== Solid phase peptide synthesis ===
Within solid phase peptide synthesis (SPPS) there exist two strategies for the synthesis of glycopeptides, linear and convergent assembly. Linear assembly relies on the synthesis of building blocks and then the use of SPPS to attach the building block together. An outline of this approach is illustrated below.

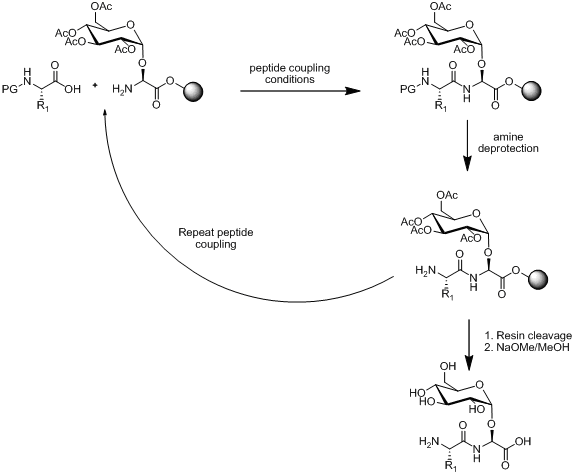
Scheme 1. Overview of the Linear Assembly Strategy

Several methods exist for the synthesis of monosaccharide amino acid building block as illustrated below.

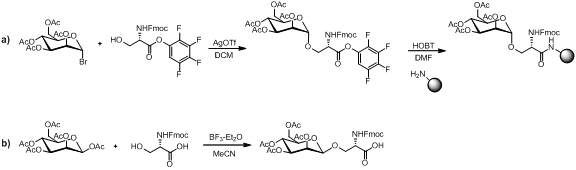
Scheme 2. a) Preparation of amino acid monosaccharide building block on resin b) Preparation of free amino acid monosaccharide building block

Provided the monosaccharide amino acid building block is stable to peptide coupling conditions, amine deprotection conditions and resin cleavage. Linear assembly remains a popular strategy for the synthesis of glycopeptides with many examples in the literature.

In the convergent assembly strategy a peptide chain and glycan residue are first synthesis separately. Then the glycan is glycosylated onto a specific residue of the peptide chain. This approach is not as popular as the linear strategy due to the poor reaction yields in the glycosylation step.

Another strategy to produce glycopeptide libraries is using Glyco-SPOT synthesis technique. The technique extends the existing method of SPOT synthesis. In this method, libraries of glycopeptides are produced on a cellulose surface (e.g. filter paper) which acts as the solid phase. The glycopeptides are produced by spotting FMOC protected amino acids allowing the synthesis to be performed at microgram (nanomole) scale using very small amounts of glycoamino acids. The scale of this technique can be an advantage for creating libraries for screening by using less amounts of glycoamino acids per peptide. However to produce larger quantities of glycopeptides traditional resin-based solid phase techniques would be better.

=== Native chemical ligation ===
Native chemical ligation (NCL) is a convergent synthetic strategy based on the linear coupling of glycopeptide fragments. This technique makes use of the chemoselective reaction between a N-terminal cysteine residue on one peptide fragment with a thio-ester on the C-terminus of the other peptide fragment as illustrated below.

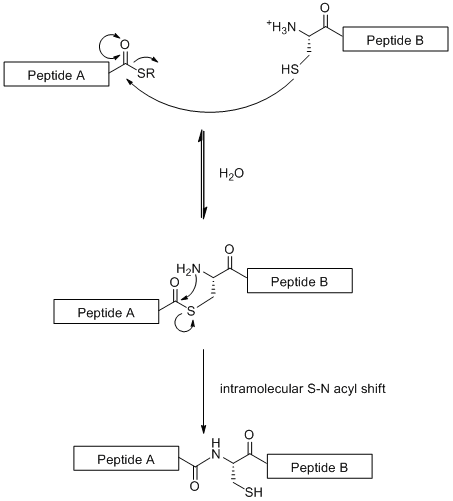
Scheme 3 Mechanism of native chemical ligation

Unlike standard SPPS (which is limited to 50 amino acid residue) NCL allows the construction of large glycopeptides. However the strategy is limited by the fact that it requires a cysteine residue at N-terminus, an amino acid residue that is rare in nature. However this problem has partly been address by the selective desulfurization of the cysteine residue to an alanine.

== See also ==
- Carbohydrate chemistry
- Glycopeptide antibiotic
- Glycosylation
- Peptide synthesis
