= Asymmetric carbon =

Carbon atom attached to four different atoms or groups

In stereochemistry, an asymmetric carbon is a carbon atom that is bonded to four different types of atoms or groups of atoms. The four atoms and/or groups attached to the carbon atom can be arranged in space in two different ways that are mirror images of each other, and which lead to so-called left-handed and right-handed versions (stereoisomers) of the same molecule. Molecules that cannot be superimposed on their own mirror image are said to be chiral; as the asymmetric carbon is the center of this chirality, it is also known as a chiral carbon.

As an example, malic acid (HOOC−CH_{2}−CH(OH)−COOH) has 4 carbon atoms but just one of them is asymmetric. The asymmetric carbon atom, bolded in the formula, is the one attached to two carbon atoms, an oxygen atom, and a hydrogen atom. One may initially be inclined to think this atom is not asymmetric because it is attached to two carbon atoms, but because those two carbon atoms are not attached to exactly the same things, there are two different groups of atoms that the carbon atom in question is attached to, therefore making it an asymmetric carbon atom:

Knowing the number of asymmetric carbon atoms, one can calculate the maximum possible number of stereoisomers for any given molecule as follows:

If n is the number of asymmetric carbon atoms then the maximum number of isomers = 2^{n} (Le Bel-van't Hoff rule)

This is a corollary of Le Bel and van't Hoff's simultaneously announced conclusions, in 1874, that the most probable orientation of the bonds of a carbon atom linked to four groups or atoms is toward the apexes of a tetrahedron, and that this accounted for all then-known phenomena of molecular asymmetry (which involved a carbon atom bearing four different atoms or groups).

A tetrose with 2 asymmetric carbon atoms has 2^{2} = 4 stereoisomers:

An aldopentose with 3 asymmetric carbon atoms has 2^{3} = 8 stereoisomers:

An aldohexose with 4 asymmetric carbon atoms has 2^{4} = 16 stereoisomers:
