= Theodor Seliwanoff =

Russian chemist (1859–1938)

Theodor Seliwanoff or Seliwanow (born Fyodor Fyodorovic Selivanov; October 8, 1859 in Gorodischtsche, Pensa–1938) was a Russian chemist who invented the Seliwanoff's test in 1887 while working at the Novorossiysk University in Odessa.

== Sources ==
- "Селиванов, Федор Федорович" . Brockhaus and Efron Encyclopedic Dictionary (in Russian). 1906.
