= Diose =

Monosaccharide with only two carbon atoms

Glycolaldehyde is the only diose

A diose is a monosaccharide containing two carbon atoms. Because the general chemical formula of an unmodified monosaccharide is (C·H_{2}O)_{n}, where n is three or greater, it does not meet the formal definition of a monosaccharide. However, since it does fit the formula (C·H_{2}O)_{n}, it is sometimes thought of as the most basic sugar.

There is only one possible diose, glycolaldehyde (2-hydroxyethanal), which is an aldodiose (a ketodiose is not possible since there are only two carbons).

== See also ==
- Triose
- Tetrose
- Pentose
- Hexose
- Heptose
