= Oligosaccharide nomenclature =

Devising names for a class of carbohydrates

Oligosaccharides and polysaccharides are an important class of polymeric carbohydrates found in virtually all living entities. Their structural features make their nomenclature challenging and their roles in living systems make their nomenclature important.

== Oligosaccharides ==
Oligosaccharides are carbohydrates that are composed of several monosaccharide residues joined through glycosidic linkage, which can be hydrolyzed by enzymes or acid to give the constituent monosaccharide units. While a strict definition of an oligosaccharide is not established, it is generally agreed that a carbohydrate consisting of two to ten monosaccharide residues with a defined structure is an oligosaccharide.

Some oligosaccharides, for example maltose, sucrose, and lactose, were trivially named before their chemical constitution was determined, and these names are still used today.

Maltose

Sucrose

Lactose

Trivial names, however, are not useful for most other oligosaccharides and, as such, systematic rules for the nomenclature of carbohydrates have been developed. To fully understand oligosaccharide and polysaccharide nomenclature, one must understand how monosaccharides are named.

An oligosaccharide has both a reducing and a non-reducing end. The reducing end of an oligosaccharide is the monosaccharide residue with hemiacetal functionality, thereby capable of reducing the Tollens’ reagent, while the non-reducing end is the monosaccharide residue in acetal form, thus incapable of reducing the Tollens’ reagent. The reducing and non-reducing ends of an oligosaccharide are conventionally drawn with the reducing-end monosaccharide residue furthest to the right and the non-reducing (or terminal) end furthest to the left.

Naming of oligosaccharides proceeds from left to right (from the non-reducing end to the reducing end) as glycosyl [glycosyl]_{n} glycoses or glycosyl [glycosyl]_{n} glycosides, depending on whether or not the reducing end is a free hemiacetal group. In parentheses, between the names of the monosaccharide residues, the number of the anomeric carbon atom, an arrow symbol, and the number of the carbon atom bearing the connecting oxygen of the next monosaccharide unit are listed. Appropriate symbols are used to indicate the stereochemistry of the glycosidic bonds (α or β), the configuration of the monosaccharide residue (D orL), and the substitutions at oxygen atoms (O). Maltose and a derivative of sucrose illustrate these concepts:

Maltose

Maltose: α-D-Glucopyranosyl-(1→4)-β-D-glucopyranose

Methyl 2,3,4-tri-O-benzyl-6-deoxy-6-fluoro-α-D-galactopyranosyl-(1→4)-2,3,6-tri-O-acetyl-β-D-glucopyranoside

Methyl 2,3,4-tri-O-benzyl-6-deoxy-6-fluoro-α-D-galactopyranosyl-(1→4)-2,3,6-tri-O-acetyl-β-D-glucopyranoside

In the case of branched oligosaccharides, meaning that the structure contains at least one monosaccharide residue linked to more than two other monosaccharide residues, terms designating the branches should be listed in square brackets, with the longest linear chain (the parent chain) written without square brackets. The following example will help illustrate this concept:

Allyl α-L-fucopyranosyl-(1→3)-[α-D-galactopyranosyl-(1→4)]-α-D-glucopyranosyl-(1→3)-α-D-galactopyranoside

Allyl α-L-fucopyranosyl-(1→3)-[α-D-galactopyranosyl-(1→4)]-α-D-glucopyranosyl-(1→3)-α-D-galactopyranoside

These systematic names are quite useful in that they provide information about the structure of the oligosaccharide. They do require a lot of space, however, so abbreviated forms are used when possible. In these abbreviated forms, the names of the monosaccharide units are shortened to their corresponding three-letter abbreviations, followed by p for pyranose or f for furanose ring structures, with the abbreviated aglyconic alcohol placed at the end of the name. Using this system, the previous example would have the abbreviated name α-L-Fucp-(1→3)-[α-D-Galp-(1→4)]-α-D-Glcp-(1→3)-α-D-GalpOAll (General formula: $\ce{C}_{n+1}\ce{(H2O)}_n$. structure formula $\ce{C12H22O11}$).

== Polysaccharides ==
Polysaccharides are considered to be polymers of monosaccharides containing ten or more monosaccharide residues. Polysaccharides have been given trivial names that reflect their origin. Two common examples are cellulose, a main component of the cell wall in plants, and starch, a name derived from the Anglo-Saxon stercan, meaning to stiffen.

To name a polysaccharide composed of a single type of monosaccharide, that is a homopolysaccharide, the ending “-ose” of the monosaccharide is replaced with “-an”. For example, a glucose polymer is named glucan, a mannose polymer is named mannan, and a galactose polymer is named galactan. When the glycosidic linkages and configurations of the monosaccharides are known, they may be included as a prefix to the name, with the notation for glycosidic linkages preceding the symbols designating the configuration. The following example will help illustrate this concept:

(1→4)-β-D-Glucan

(1→4)-β-D-Glucan

A heteropolysaccharide is a polymer containing more than one kind of monosaccharide residue. The parent chain contains only one type of monosaccharide and should be listed last with the ending “-an”, and the other types of monosaccharides listed in alphabetical order as “glyco-” prefixes. When there is no parent chain, all different monosaccharide residues are to be listed alphabetically as “glyco-” prefixes and the name should end with “-glycan”. The following example will help illustrate this concept:

((1→2)-α-D-galacto)-(1→4)-β-D-Glucan

((1→2)-α-D-galacto)-(1→4)-β-D-Glucan

== See also ==
- Oligosaccharide
- Carbohydrate Conformation
- Monosaccharide
- Monosaccharide nomenclature
