= Seliwanoff's test =

Chemical test

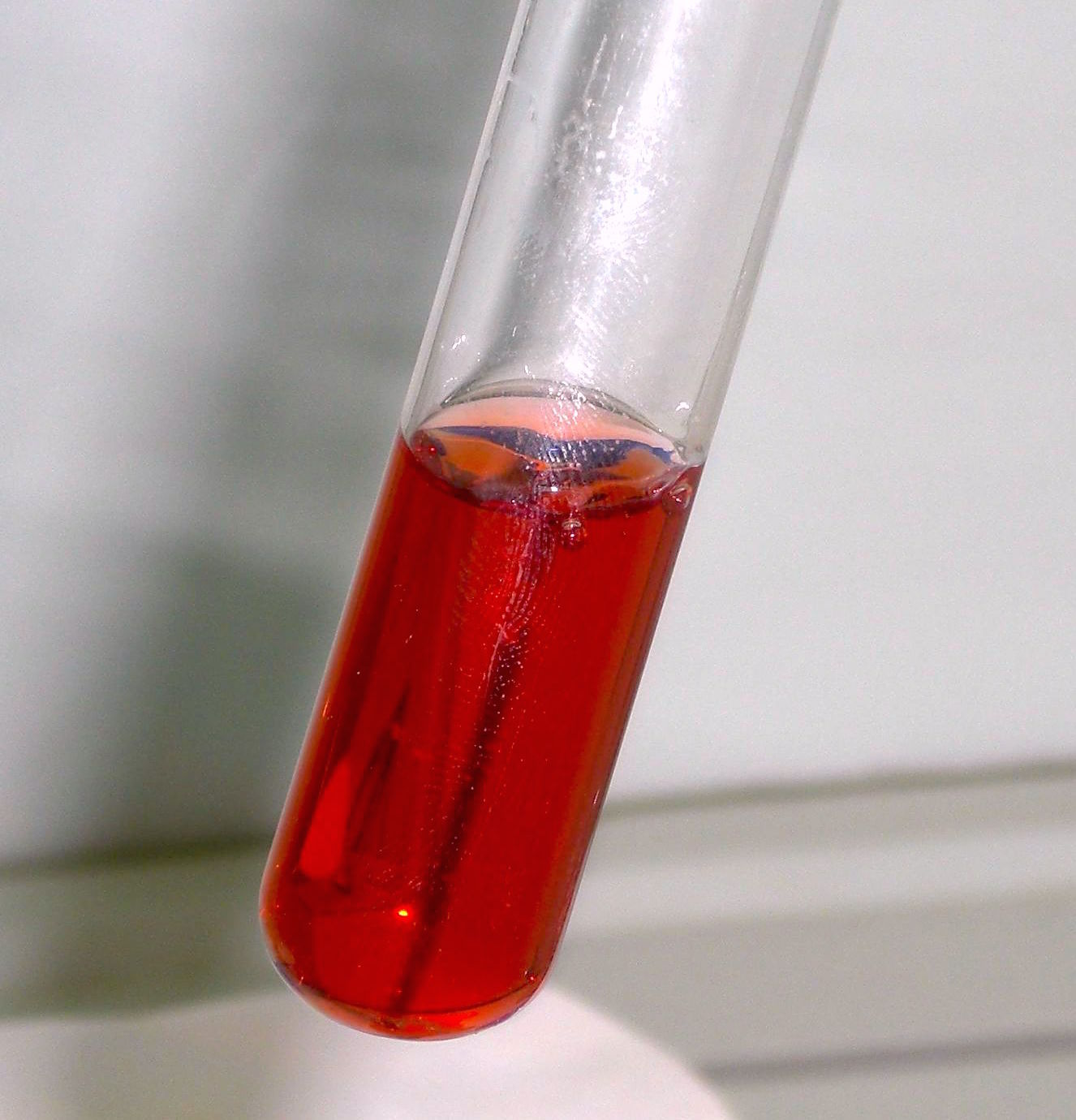
An example of a positive Seliwanoff’s test

Seliwanoff’s test is an archaic chemical test that is used to distinguish between aldose and ketose sugars. If the sugar contains a ketone group, it is a ketose. If a sugar contains an aldehyde group, it is an aldose. This test relies on the principle that, when heated, ketoses are more rapidly dehydrated than aldoses. It is named after Theodor Seliwanoff, the chemist who devised the test. The test is also known as the resorcinol test.

== Chemical principles ==
The reagents consist of resorcinol and concentrated hydrochloric acid. Generally, 6M HCl is used to run this test. Ketoses are dehydrated faster and give stronger colors. Aldoses react very slowly and give faint colors.

The acid hydrolysis of polysaccharide and oligosaccharide ketoses yields simpler sugars such as fructose. In the presence of strong acid, fructose dehydrates to give hydroxymethylfurfural (HMF). The formyl group of the HMF condenses with two equivalents of resorcinol to produce a deep cherry red analogue of fluorescein. Aldoses may react slightly to produce a faint pink color.

When the test solution is added to a solution containing ketoses, a red color is formed rapidly indicating a positive test. When added to a solution containing aldoses, a slower forming light pink is observed instead. Fructose and sucrose are two common sugars which give a positive test. Sucrose gives a positive test as it is a disaccharide consisting of fructose and glucose.

Seliwanoff-Reaction

== Sources ==
- Katoch, Rajan (2011-06-30). Analytical Techniques in Biochemistry and Molecular Biology. Springer. p. 71. ISBN 978-1-4419-9784-5.
- Chawla (2003-01-01). Practical Clinical Biochemistry: Methods and Interpretations. Jaypee Brothers, Medical Publishers. p. 35. ISBN 978-81-8061-108-7.
