= Nonose =

Class of carbohydrate

A nonose is a monosaccharide with nine carbons.

== Nonoses types ==
Depending on the position of the functional groups, a distinction is made between ketononoses and aldononoses.

Aldononoses have seven chiral centers, which allows the formation of 128 stereoisomers (2^{7}), which differ in the position of the hydroxyl groups or the asymmetric carbon atom. Ketononoses have six chiral centers, which gives the possibility of 64 different possible stereoisomers.

== Nonoses families ==
- Neuraminic acid
- Sialic acid
- Legionaminic acid
- Pseudaminic acid
