= Joseph Achille Le Bel =

French chemist (1847–1930)

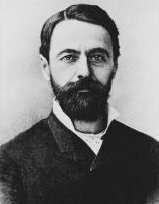
- Born: 28 January 1847; Pechelbronn, Bas-Rhin
- Died: 6 August 1930 (aged 83); Paris
- Education: École Polytechnique, Paris
- Known for: Stereochemistry; Le Bel–Van 't Hoff rule
- Awards: Davy Medal (1893)

Joseph Achille Le Bel (21 January 1847 in Pechelbronn – 6 August 1930, in Paris, France) was a French chemist. He is best known for his work in stereochemistry. Le Bel was educated at the École Polytechnique in Paris. In 1874 he announced his theory outlining the relationship between molecular structure and optical activity. This discovery laid the foundation of the science of stereochemistry, which deals with the spatial arrangement of atoms in molecules. This hypothesis was put forward in the same year by the Dutch physical chemist Jacobus Henricus van 't Hoff and is currently known as Le Bel–van't Hoff rule. Le Bel wrote Cosmologie Rationelle (Rational Cosmology) in 1929.

== Works ==
- George Mann Richardson, Louis Pasteur, Jacobus van 't Hoff, Joseph Achille Le Bel, Johannes Wislicenus (1901). The Foundations of Stereo Chemistry. Memoirs by Pasteur, van't Hoff, Lebel and Wislicenus. New York: American Book Co. OCLC 2753817
- Maury J., Joseph Achille Le Bel, Arthur Edmunds (1925). Laugerie Basse : The Excavations of M. J.-A. Le Bel. Le Mans: Monnoyer. OCLC 1742132. OCLC 1742132
- Le Bel, J.-A. (1949). Vie et œuvres de Joseph-Achille Le Bel (in French). Paris: Impr. P. Dupont. OCLC 113374. OCLC 1133741

== See also ==
- Chemical crystallography before X-rays
- Hexamethylbenzene
- Optical rotation
