= Octose =

Class of carbohydrate

An octose is a monosaccharide containing eight carbon atoms. Lincomycin contains the octose methylthiolincosamide.

== See also ==
- Heptose
- Hexose
- Pentose
