= Lyxose =

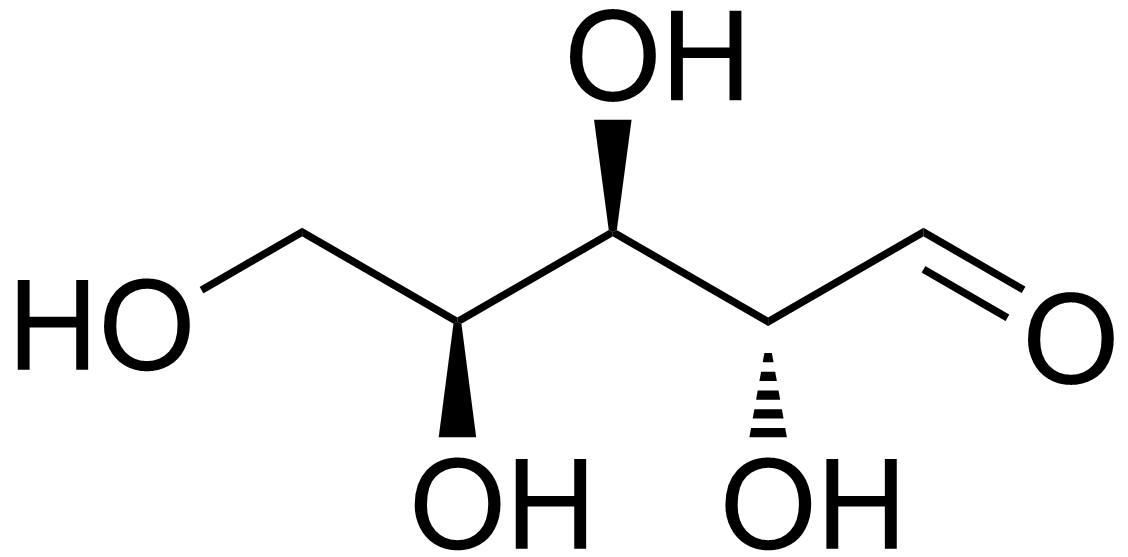

Names
- IUPAC names Lyxose lyxo-Pentose
- Systematic IUPAC name (2R,3R,4S)-2,3,4,5-Tetrahydroxypentanal
- Other names L-Lyxose; Lyxopyranose

Identifiers
CAS Number	1949-78-6
3D model (JSmol)	Interactive image
ChEBI	CHEBI:28480
ChEMBL	ChEMBL1159661
ChemSpider	559211
EC Number	217-763-2
PubChem CID	65550
UNII	M7J5HM9DY4
- InChI: InChI=1S/C5H10O5/c6-1-3(8)5(10)4(9)2-7/h1,3-5,7-10H,2H2/t3-,4-,5-/m0/s1 Key: PYMYPHUHKUWMLA-YUPRTTJUSA-N
- SMILES: C([C@@H]([C@H]([C@H](C=O)O)O)O)O

Properties
Chemical formula	C_{5}H_{10}O_{5}
Molar mass	150.130 g·mol^{−1}
Density	1.545 g cm^{−3}
Melting point	108 °C (226 °F; 381 K)
Solubility in water	Soluble in water
- Except where otherwise noted, data are given for materials in their standard state (at 25 °C [77 °F], 100 kPa). verify (what is ?) Infobox references

Lyxose is an aldopentose — a monosaccharide containing five carbon atoms, and including an aldehyde functional group. It has chemical formula C_{5}H_{10}O_{5}. It is a C'-2 carbon epimer of the sugar xylose. The name "lyxose" comes from reversing the prefix "xyl" in "xylose".

Lyxose occurs only rarely in nature, for example, as a component of bacterial glycolipids.

D-Lyxose in both its furanose and pyranose forms
