= Allulose =

Chemical compound

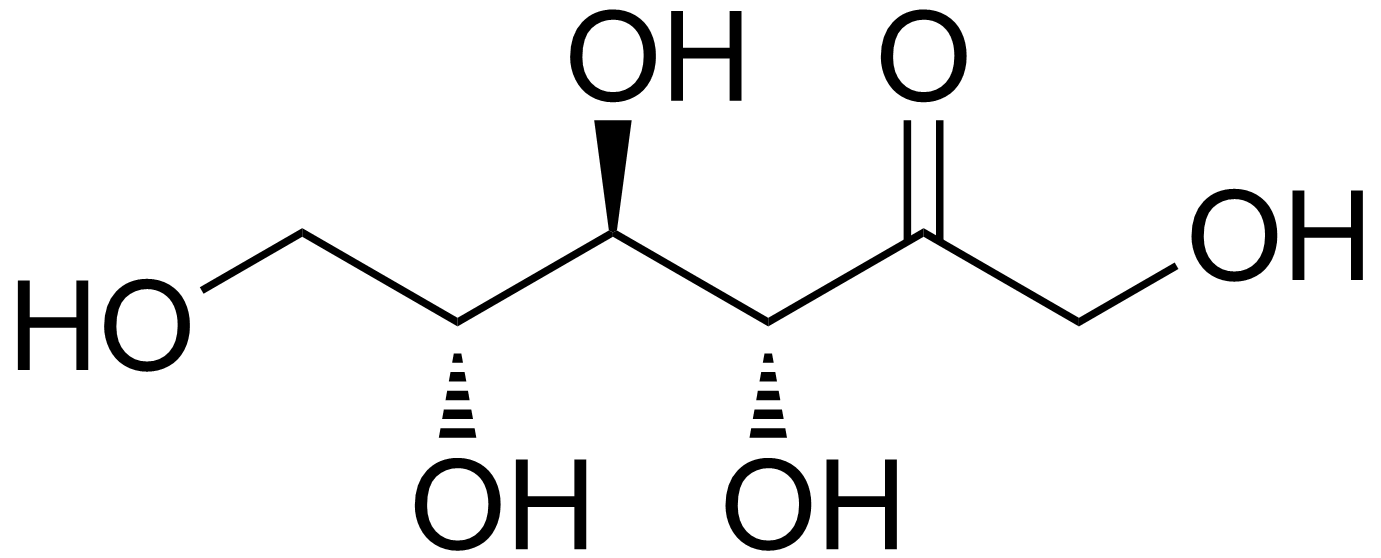

Names
- IUPAC name D-ribo-Hex-2-ulose
- Systematic IUPAC name (3R,4R,5R)-1,3,4,5,6-Pentahydroxyhexan-2-one
- Other names D-Allulose; D-Psicose; D-Ribo-2-hexulose; Pseudofructose

Identifiers
CAS Number	551-68-8
3D model (JSmol)	Interactive image
ChEBI	CHEBI:27605
ChemSpider	81254
ECHA InfoCard	100.008.182
MeSH	psicose
PubChem CID	90008
UNII	QCC18LNG3E
CompTox Dashboard (EPA)	DTXSID201337628
- InChI: InChI=1S/C6H12O6/c7-1-3(9)5(11)6(12)4(10)2-8/h3,5-9,11-12H,1-2H2/t3-,5-,6+/m1/s1 Key: BJHIKXHVCXFQLS-PUFIMZNGSA-N; InChI=1/C6H12O6/c7-1-3(9)5(11)6(12)4(10)2-8/h3,5-9,11-12H,1-2H2/t3-,5-,6+/m1/s1 Key: BJHIKXHVCXFQLS-PUFIMZNGBH
- SMILES: O=C([C@H](O)[C@H](O)[C@H](O)CO)CO

Properties
Chemical formula	C_{6}H_{12}O_{6}
Molar mass	180.156 g·mol^{−1}
Melting point	58 °C (136 °F; 331 K)
- Except where otherwise noted, data are given for materials in their standard state (at 25 °C [77 °F], 100 kPa). verify (what is ?) Infobox references

D-Allulose (C_{6}H_{12}O_{6}), also known simply as allulose or as D-psicose, is an epimer of fructose that is used by some commercial food and beverage manufacturers as a low-calorie sweetener. Allulose occurs naturally in small quantities in a variety of foods. It was first identified in the 1940s, although the enzymes needed to produce it on an industrial scale were not discovered until the 1990s.

The U.S. Food and Drug Administration (FDA) has accepted a petition for allulose to be considered generally recognized as safe (GRAS) as a sugar substitute in various specified food categories. Because it is absorbed and metabolized differently from other sugars, the FDA has exempted allulose from the listing of total and added sugars on the Nutrition and Supplement Facts labels, but requires its weight listing as a carbohydrate, with 0.4 kcal/g (about 1/10 the calories of ordinary carbohydrates).

Studies have shown the commercial product is not absorbed in the human body the way common sugars are and does not raise insulin levels, but more testing may be needed to evaluate any other potential side effects. In 2020, the U.S. FDA accepted the conclusion by Samyang that the maximum tolerable consumption for a 60 kg adult was 33 to 36 grams per day.

== Biochemistry ==
The sweetness of allulose is estimated to be 70% of the sweetness of sucrose. It has some cooling sensation and no bitterness. Its taste is said to be sugar-like, in contrast to certain other sweeteners, like the high-intensity sugar substitutes aspartame and saccharin. The caloric value of allulose in humans is about 0.2 to 0.4 kcal/g, relative to about 4 kcal/g for typical carbohydrates. In rats, the relative energy value of allulose was found to be 0.007 kcal/g, or approximately 0.3% of that of sucrose. Similar to the sugar alcohol erythritol, allulose is minimally metabolized and is excreted largely unchanged. The glycemic index of allulose is very low or negligible.

Allulose is a weak inhibitor of the enzymes α-glucosidase, α-amylase, maltase, and sucrase. Because of this, it can inhibit the metabolism of starch and disaccharides into monosaccharides in the gastrointestinal tract. Additionally, allulose inhibits the absorption of glucose via transporters in the intestines. For these reasons, allulose has potential antihyperglycemic effects, and has been found to reduce postprandial hyperglycemia in humans. Through modulation of lipogenic enzymes in the liver, allulose may also have antihyperlipidemic effects.

Due to its effect of causing incomplete absorption of carbohydrates from the gastrointestinal tract, and subsequent fermentation of these carbohydrates by intestinal bacteria, allulose can result in unpleasant symptoms such as flatulence, abdominal discomfort, and diarrhea. The maximum non-effect dose of allulose in causing diarrhea in humans has been found to be 0.55 g/kg of body weight. This is higher than that of most sugar alcohols (0.17–0.42 g/kg), but is less than that of erythritol (0.66–1.0+ g/kg).

D-Allulose was found to be more reactive than fructose and glucose in glycation reactions when heated in the microwave oven.

=== Effect on carbohydrate absorption ===
A meta-analysis was conducted of the effect on postprandial glucose and insulin responses of adding a median of 5 grams of allulose (range, 2.5–10 g) to a fixed carbohydrate-containing drink or meal, versus the same meal alone. Overall, compared to the carbohydrate-containing meal alone, the same meal with a small dose of added allulose resulted in a 10% lower incremental area under the curve (iAUC) of postprandial glucose. The upshot is that adding allulose led to modest improvement in insulin regulation versus the same meal alone. The quality of the evidence was rated as moderate.

== Chemistry ==
Haworth projection of D-allulose

Allulose, also known by its systematic name D-ribo-2-hexulose as well as by the name D-psicose, is a monosaccharide and a ketohexose. It is a C3 epimer of fructose. Fructose can be converted to allulose by the enzymes D-tagatose 3-epimerase (EC 5.1.3.31) and/or D-psicose 3-epimerase (EC 5.1.3.30), which has allowed for mass production of allulose. The compound is found naturally in trace amounts in wheat, figs, raisins, maple syrup, and molasses. Allulose has similar physical properties to those of regular sugar, such as bulk, mouthfeel, browning capability, and freezing point depression. This makes it favorable for use as a sugar replacement in food products, including ice cream.

In a paper produced for the European Food Safety Authority, the enzyme d-psicose 3-epimerase, manufactured by Matsutani Chemical Industry Co., Ltd, was investigated for safety and allergenicity. No DNA of E. coli (used for production of the enzyme) was found in the enzyme preparation, and no match was found in the enzyme amino acid sequence with those of known allergens.

== History ==
Allulose was first discovered in the 1940s. The first mass-production method for allulose was established when Ken Izumori at Kagawa University in Japan discovered the key enzyme, D-tagatose 3-epimerase, to convert fructose to allulose in 1994. This method of production has a high yield, but has a very high production cost.

=== Regulatory history ===
==== United States ====
In June 2012, the U.S. Food and Drug Administration (FDA) accepted the assertion of CJ CheilJedang, Inc. of South Korea that allulose is generally recognized as safe (GRAS) as a sugar substitute in various specified food categories. In June 2014, a similar GRAS letter was issued to Matsutani Chemical Industry Company, Ltd. of Japan. Non-GMO allulose manufactured by Samyang Corp. of South Korea was approved as GRAS in March 2020.

The U.S. FDA in October 2019 announced the exemption of allulose from total and added sugars on nutritional labels, but manufacturers must continue to include allulose in the total carbohydrates declaration, with a value of 0.4kcal/g, "0.4 calories per gram of allulose".

==== Other jurisdictions ====
As of July 2026 allulose is not approved in either Canada or the EU. Both remain firmly in "not authorized" status, though for slightly different procedural reasons.

===== Canada =====
Allulose is treated as a novel food under Canada's Food and Drug Regulations, and it does not appear on Health Canada's official List of Permitted Sweeteners, while erythritol, monk fruit extract, steviol glycosides, and others are listed. As of mid-2025, no completed assessment for allulose appeared on Health Canada's "Completed Safety Assessments of Novel Foods" list, and as of December 2024/March 2025 checks, it is still not on the List of Permitted Sweeteners, meaning Canadian national-brand launches remain constrained. It is not "banned" outright (personal import/purchase isn't illegal), but it can't legally be sold as a food ingredient in Canada yet.

===== European Union =====
In the European Union, although allulose is a naturally occurring saccharide, under EU regulations, monosaccharides and other saccharides are not considered food additives, and thus cannot be approved as such, but must be approved as ingredients. CJ-Tereos Sweeteners of France filed for such an approval in April 2018. The Allulose Novel Food Consortium (ANFC) was formed in 2021 by four Japanese, Korean, U.S. and European food ingredient companies to speed its approval as an ingredient in Europe, including exemption from sugar labelling.

EFSA's Panel on Nutrition, Novel Foods and Food Allergens published its opinion on D-allulose as a novel food on 5 June 2025, concluding that its safety could not be established because the applicant did not respond to EFSA's repeated requests for additional data on identity, production process, use levels, genotoxicity, and human data. This was a negative safety opinion, not a ban on public-health grounds — allulose has never received authorization as a novel food under EU law. It is not banned, but the EU's precautionary "no data, no approval" default means allulose's safety cannot be legally determined until sufficient evidence is provided to the EFSA.

== Manufacturing ==
Allulose is produced by an enzymatic reaction that converts fructose into allulose. As of 2018, most commercially available allulose uses corn (maize) as the source of fructose. Another source of fructose is from sugar beet.

== Commercial application ==
Commercial manufacturers and food laboratories are looking into properties of allulose that may differentiate it from sucrose and fructose sweeteners, including an ability to induce the high foaming property of egg white protein and the production of antioxidant substances produced through the Maillard reaction.

Commercial uses of allulose include low-calorie sweeteners in beverages, yogurt, ice cream, baked goods, and other typically high-calorie items. London-based Tate & Lyle released its proprietary variant of allulose, known as Dolcia Prima allulose, and U.S.-based Anderson Global Group released its own proprietary variant into the North American market in 2015. The first major food company to adopt allulose as a sweetener was Quest Nutrition in some of their protein bar products.

On April 16, 2019, US Food and Drug Administration (FDA) issued a draft guidance, allowing food manufacturers to exclude allulose from total and added sugar counts on Nutrition and Supplement Facts labels. Like sugar alcohols and dietary fiber, allulose will still count towards total carbohydrates on nutrition labels. This, combined with the GRAS designation, has increased interest in including allulose in food products instead of sucrose.

As of April 2025, allulose is not approved as a food additive in Canada and the EU.
