= Sorbose =

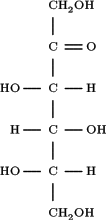

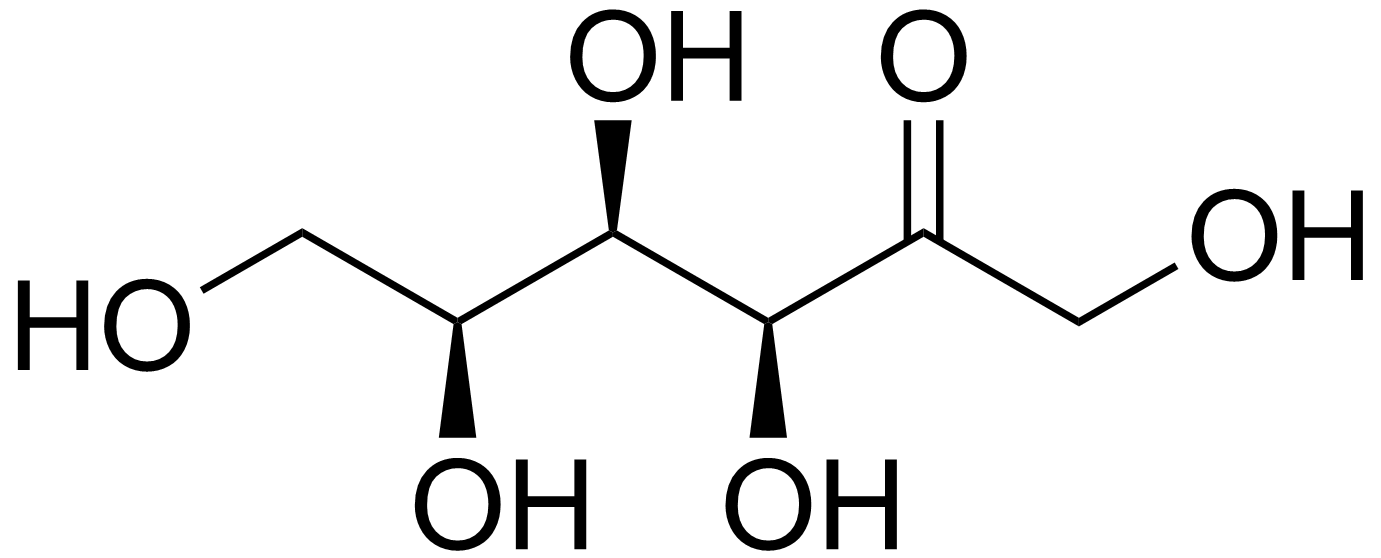

Names
- IUPAC name L-xylo-Hex-2-ulose
- Systematic IUPAC name (3S,4R,5S)-1,3,4,5,6-Pentahydroxyhexan-2-one
- Other names Sorbinose; L-xylo-Hexulose

Identifiers
CAS Number	87-79-6
3D model (JSmol)	Interactive image
ChemSpider	6638
ECHA InfoCard	100.001.611
PubChem CID	6904
UNII	NV2001607Y
- InChI: InChI=1S/C6H12O6/c7-1-3(9)5(11)6(12)4(10)2-8/h3,5-9,11-12H,1-2H2/t3-,5+,6+/m0/s1 Key: BJHIKXHVCXFQLS-OTWZMJIISA-N; InChI=1/C6H12O6/c7-1-3(9)5(11)6(12)4(10)2-8/h3,5-9,11-12H,1-2H2/t3-,5+,6+/m0/s1 Key: BJHIKXHVCXFQLS-OTWZMJIIBK
- SMILES: C([C@@H]([C@H]([C@@H](C(=O)CO)O)O)O)O

Properties
Chemical formula	C_{6}H_{12}O_{6}
Molar mass	180.156 g·mol^{−1}
Appearance	white solid
Density	1.65 g/cm^{3} (15 °C)
Melting point	165 °C (329 °F; 438 K)
Solubility in water	Highly Soluble
- Except where otherwise noted, data are given for materials in their standard state (at 25 °C [77 °F], 100 kPa). verify (what is ?) Infobox references

Sorbose is a ketose belonging to the group of sugars known as monosaccharides. It has a sweetness that is equivalent to sucrose (table sugar). The commercial production of vitamin C (ascorbic acid) often begins with sorbose. L-Sorbose is the configuration of the naturally occurring sugar. It can be prepared from inexpensive O-benzylglucose.

== Synthesis ==
Under conditions employed for a Meerwein-Ponndorf-Verley reduction, the tetra-O-benzyl aldose converts to tetra-O-benzylsorbose. Hydrogenolysis removes the four benzyl groups, leaving sorbose.
