= Triose =

Sugar containing three carbon atoms

D-Glyceraldehyde is an aldotriose because the carbonyl group is at the end of the chain

Dihydroxyacetone is a ketotriose because the carbonyl group is the center of the chain.

A triose is a monosaccharide, or simple sugar, containing three carbon atoms. There are only three possible trioses: the two enantiomers of glyceraldehyde, which are aldoses; and dihydroxyacetone, a ketose which is symmetrical and therefore has no enantiomers.

Trioses are important in photosynthesis and cellular respiration. During glycolysis, fructose-1,6-bisphosphate is broken down into glyceraldehyde-3-phosphate and dihydroxyacetone phosphate. Lactic acid and pyruvic acid are later derived from these molecules.

Importance of triose in animal physiology:

- Trioses serve as metabolic intermediates in various different metabolic pathways such as glycolysis, gluconeogenesis, and the pentose phosphate pathway.
- Trioses contribute to the synthesis of essential biomolecules including lipids, amino acids, nucleotides, and carbohydrates.
- Trioses are small carbon molecules and can therefore be easily modified into various molecules.
