= Altrose =

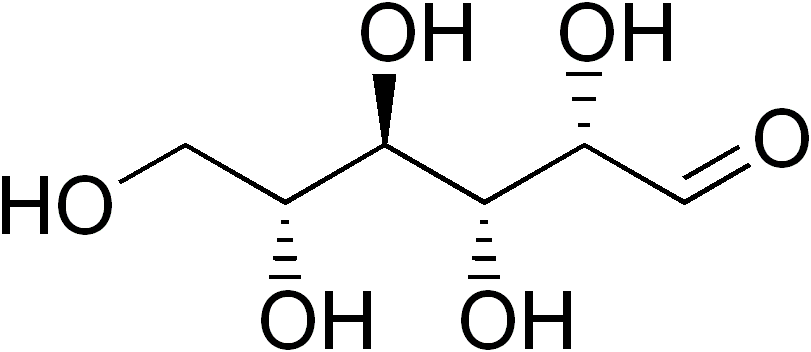
- Stereo structural formula of (5R)-altrose

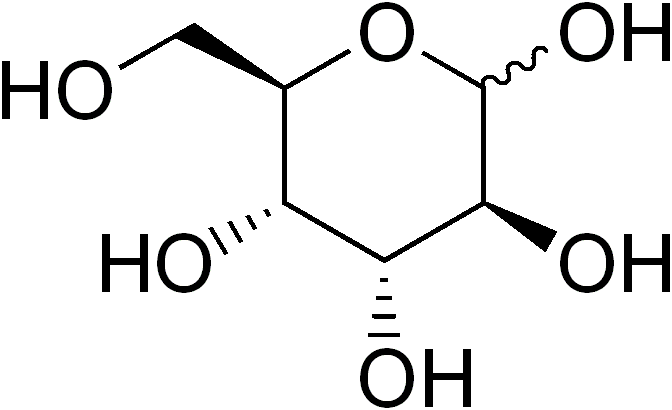
- Stereo structural formula of (6R)-altropyranose

Names
- IUPAC name altro-Hexose
- Preferred IUPAC name Altrose
- Systematic IUPAC name (2S,3R,4R)-2,3,4,5,6-Pentahydroxyhexanal

Identifiers
CAS Number	1990-29-0 (D); 1949-88-8 (L)
3D model (JSmol)	Interactive image; Interactive image
ChEBI	CHEBI:28385 (D); CHEBI:63421 (L)
ChemSpider	389851
KEGG	C06464 (D)
PubChem CID	441032 (D); 10219674 (L)
UNII	5PLN1O36FF (D)
- InChI: InChI=1S/C6H12O6/c7-1-3(9)5(11)6(12)4(10)2-8/h1,3-6,8-12H,2H2/t3-,4?,5+,6-/m1/s1 Key: GZCGUPFRVQAUEE-ZPQYLTHOSA-N; InChI=1S/C6H12O6/c7-1-2-3(8)4(9)5(10)6(11)12-2/h2-11H,1H2/t2-,3-,4-,5+,6?/m1/s1; InChI=1S/C6H12O6/c7-1-2-3(8)4(9)5(10)6(11)12-2/h2-11H,1H2/t2-,3-,4-,5+,6?/m1/s1 Key: WQZGKKKJIJFFOK-RSVSWTKNSA-N
- SMILES: OCC(O)[C@@H](O)[C@@H](O)[C@H](O)C=O; O[C@@H]1[C@H](O)[C@H](OC(O)[C@H]1O)CO

Properties
Chemical formula	C_{6}H_{12}O_{6}
Molar mass	180.156 g·mol^{−1}
Melting point	103 to 105 °C (217 to 221 °F; 376 to 378 K)
- Except where otherwise noted, data are given for materials in their standard state (at 25 °C [77 °F], 100 kPa). verify (what is ?) Infobox references

Altrose is an aldohexose sugar. D-Altrose is an unnatural monosaccharide. It is soluble in water and practically insoluble in methanol. However, L-altrose has been isolated from strains of the bacterium Butyrivibrio fibrisolvens.

Altrose is a C-3 epimer of mannose. The ring conformation of α-altropyranoside is flexible compared to most other aldohexopyranosides, with idose as exception. In solution different derivatives of altrose have been shown to occupy both ^{4}C_{1}, ^{O}S_{2} and ^{1}C_{4}-conformations.

Haworth projections of various forms of D-altrose
