= Idose =

- Haworth projection of α-d-idopyranose

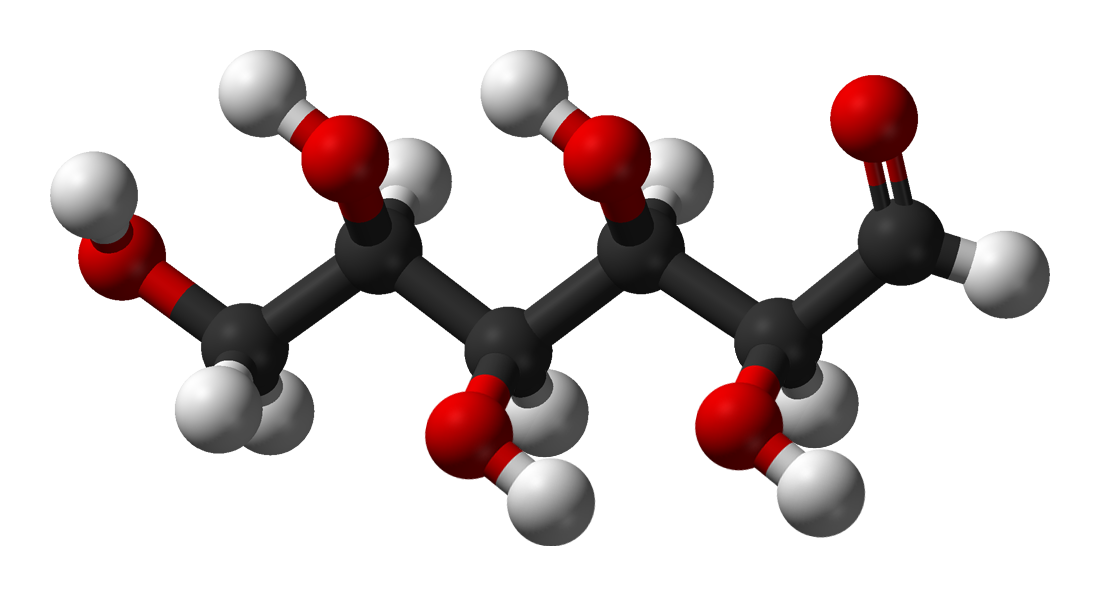

Names
- IUPAC names Idose ido-Hexose
- Systematic IUPAC name (3S,4R,5R,6R)-6-(Hydroxymethyl)oxane-2,3,4,5-tetrol

Identifiers
CAS Number	5978-95-0 natural enantiomer (D); 2152-76-3 racemate
3D model (JSmol)	Interactive image
ChemSpider	389853
PubChem CID	441034
UNII	2YL114VI04
- InChI: InChI=1S/C6H12O6/c7-1-2-3(8)4(9)5(10)6(11)12-2/h2-11H,1H2/t2-,3+,4-,5+,6?/m1/s1 Key: WQZGKKKJIJFFOK-YIDFTEPTSA-N; InChI=1/C6H12O6/c7-1-2-3(8)4(9)5(10)6(11)12-2/h2-11H,1H2/t2-,3+,4-,5+,6?/m1/s1 Key: WQZGKKKJIJFFOK-YIDFTEPTBS
- SMILES: O[C@@H]1[C@@H](O)[C@H](OC(O)[C@H]1O)CO

Properties
Chemical formula	C_{6}H_{12}O_{6}
Molar mass	180.156 g·mol^{−1}
Appearance	white solid
Melting point	132 °C (270 °F; 405 K)
- Except where otherwise noted, data are given for materials in their standard state (at 25 °C [77 °F], 100 kPa). verify (what is ?) Infobox references

Idose is a hexose, a six carbon monosaccharide. It has an aldehyde group and is thus an aldose. Idose is not found in nature, but its oxidized derivative iduronic acid, is a component of dermatan sulfate and heparan sulfate, which are glycosaminoglycans. The first and third hydroxyls point the opposite way from the second and fourth. It is made by aldol condensation of D- and L-glyceraldehyde. L-Idose is a C-5 epimer of D-glucose.

It can be identified by mass spectrometry.
