= Allose =

- Stereo structural formula of (6R)-allopyranose Haworth projection of α-d-allopyranose

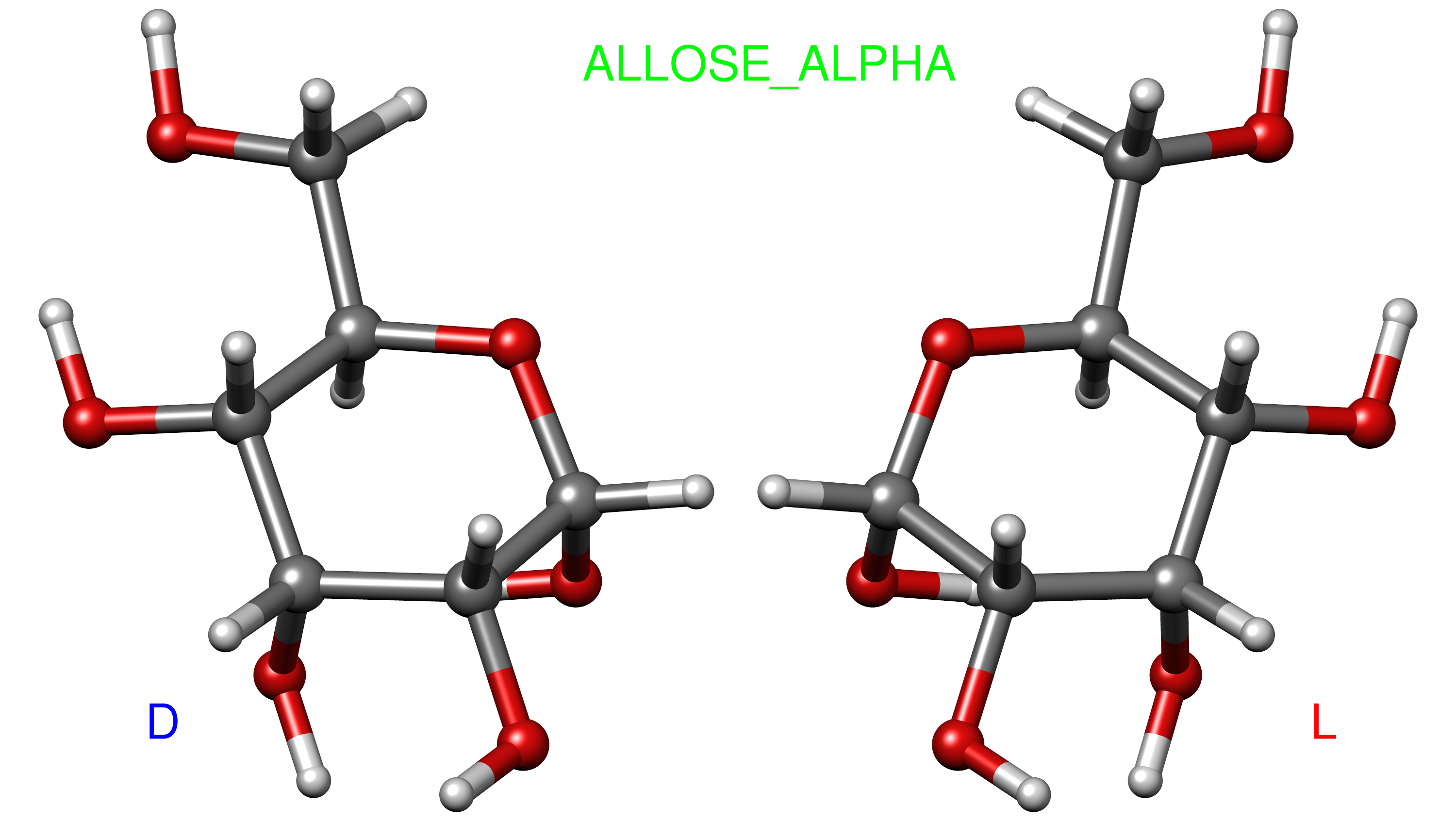
- Ball-and-stick model of Alpha-allose (D, L)

Names
- IUPAC name allo-Hexose
- Preferred IUPAC name Allose
- Systematic IUPAC name (2R,3R,4R,5R)-2,3,4,5,6-Pentahydroxyhexanal

Identifiers
CAS Number	2595-97-3 (D); 7635-11-2 (L)
3D model (JSmol)	Interactive image
ChEBI	CHEBI:40822
ChemSpider	92408
PubChem CID	102288
UNII	SV1ATP0KYY (D)
- InChI: InChI=1S/C6H12O6/c7-1-3(9)5(11)6(12)4(10)2-8/h1,3-6,8-12H,2H2/t3-,4?,5-,6+/m0/s1 Key: GZCGUPFRVQAUEE-OBOOZECYSA-N
- SMILES: OCC(O)[C@@H](O)[C@@H](O)[C@@H](O)C=O

Properties
Chemical formula	C_{6}H_{12}O_{6}
Molar mass	180.156 g·mol^{−1}
Melting point	128 °C (262 °F; 401 K)
- Except where otherwise noted, data are given for materials in their standard state (at 25 °C [77 °F], 100 kPa). verify (what is ?) Infobox references

Allose is an aldohexose sugar. It is a rare monosaccharide that occurs as a 6-O-cinnamyl glycoside in the leaves of the African shrub Protea rubropilosa. Extracts from the fresh-water alga Ochromas malhamensis contain this sugar but of unknown absolute configuration. It is soluble in water and practically insoluble in methanol.

Reduction of allose by catalytic hydrogenation produces an obscure sugar alcohol allitol which is rarely used in the chemical industry.

Allose is a C-3 epimer of glucose.
