= Talose =

d-Talose
- D-Talose Haworth projection of α-d-talopyranose

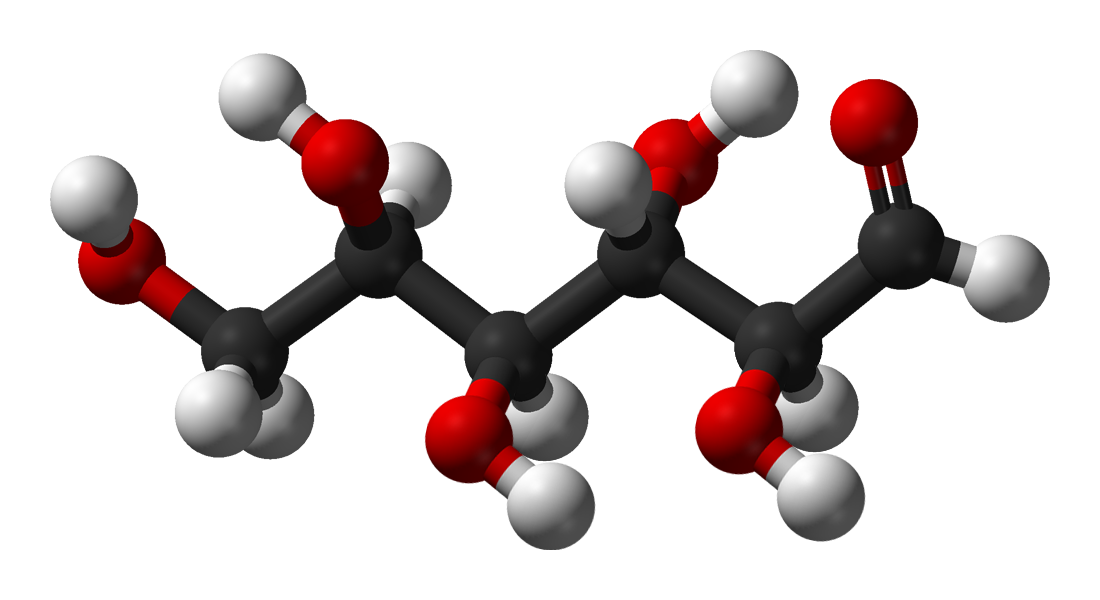
- D-Talose (open-chain form)

Names
- IUPAC names Talose talo-Hexose
- Systematic IUPAC name (3S,4S,5R,6R)-6-(Hydroxymethyl)oxane-2,3,4,5-tetrol

Identifiers
CAS Number	2595-98-4 (d); 23567-25-1 (l)
3D model (JSmol)	Interactive image
Abbreviations	Tal
ChEBI	CHEBI:28458
ChemSpider	89855
PubChem CID	99459
UNII	8ZW23G7NVD
- InChI: InChI=1S/C6H12O6/c7-1-3(9)5(11)6(12)4(10)2-8/h1,3-6,8-12H,2H2/t3-,4-,5-,6+/m1/s1 Key: GZCGUPFRVQAUEE-KAZBKCHUSA-N; InChI=1/C6H12O6/c7-1-3(9)5(11)6(12)4(10)2-8/h1,3-6,8-12H,2H2/t3-,4-,5-,6+/m1/s1 Key: GZCGUPFRVQAUEE-KAZBKCHUBG
- SMILES: O=C[C@@H](O)[C@@H](O)[C@@H](O)[C@H](O)CO

Properties
Chemical formula	C_{6}H_{12}O_{6}
Molar mass	180.16 g/mol
Density	1.581 g/mL
Melting point	124 to 127 °C (255 to 261 °F; 397 to 400 K)
Solubility in water	0.1 g/mL
- Except where otherwise noted, data are given for materials in their standard state (at 25 °C [77 °F], 100 kPa). verify (what is ?) Infobox references

Talose is an aldohexose sugar. It is an unnatural monosaccharide, that is soluble in water and slightly soluble in methanol. Some etymologists suggest that talose's name derives from the automaton of Greek mythology named Talos, but the relevance is unclear.

Talose is a C-2 epimer of galactose and a C-4 epimer of mannose.
