= Gulose =

Rare monosaccharide not fermentable by yeast

d-Gulose
- Gulose

Names
- IUPAC names D-Gulose d-gulo-Hexose
- Systematic IUPAC name (3R,4R,5R,6R)-6-(Hydroxymethyl)tetrahydro-2H-pyran-2,3,4,5-tetraol

Identifiers
CAS Number	4205-23-6 (d); 6027-89-0 (l)
3D model (JSmol)	Interactive image
ChEBI	CHEBI:37695
ChemSpider	146783
DrugBank	DB01914
PubChem CID	167792
UNII	25008KX916 (d); J96E9Q45N7 (l)
- InChI: InChI=1S/C6H12O6/c7-1-3(9)5(11)6(12)4(10)2-8/h1,3-6,8-12H,2H2/t3-,4+,5-,6-/m0/s1 Key: GZCGUPFRVQAUEE-FSIIMWSLSA-N; InChI=1/C6H12O6/c7-1-3(9)5(11)6(12)4(10)2-8/h1,3-6,8-12H,2H2/t3-,4+,5-,6-/m0/s1 Key: GZCGUPFRVQAUEE-FSIIMWSLBF
- SMILES: O=C[C@H](O)[C@H](O)[C@@H](O)[C@H](O)CO

Properties
Chemical formula	C_{6}H_{12}O_{6}
Molar mass	180.156 g·mol^{−1}
- Except where otherwise noted, data are given for materials in their standard state (at 25 °C [77 °F], 100 kPa). verify (what is ?) Infobox references

Gulose is an aldohexose sugar. It is a monosaccharide that is very rare in nature, but has been found in archaea, bacteria and eukaryotes. It also exists as a syrup with a sweet taste. It is soluble in water and slightly soluble in methanol. Neither the d- nor l-forms are fermentable by yeast.

D-Gulose is a C-3 epimer of D-galactose and a C-5 epimer of L-mannose.
