= C4H8O4 =

The molecular formula C_{4}H_{8}O_{4} (molar mass: 120.10 g/mol, exact mass: 120.042259 u) may refer to:

- Tetroses
  - Erythrose
  - Erythrulose (or D-Erythrulose)
  - Threose
