= Tetrose =

Monosaccharide with four carbon atoms

In organic chemistry, a tetrose is a monosaccharide with 4 carbon atoms. They have either an aldehyde (−CH=O) functional group in position 1 (aldotetroses) or a ketone (>C=O) group in position 2 (ketotetroses).

D-Erythrose

D-Threose

D-Erythrulose

The aldotetroses have two chiral centers (asymmetric carbon atoms) and so 4 different stereoisomers are possible. There are two naturally occurring stereoisomers, the enantiomers of erythrose and threose having the D configuration but not the L enantiomers. The ketotetroses have one chiral center and, therefore, two possible stereoisomers: erythrulose (L- and D-form). Again, only the D enantiomer is naturally occurring.

== Biological Functions ==
There are a few known ways that tetrose sugars are used in nature. Some are seen in metabolic pathways and others are known to affect certain enzymes.

=== Intermediates in the Pentose Phosphate Pathway ===
One of the metabolic pathways that a tetrose is involved in is the Pentose Phosphate Pathway. In the Pentose Phosphate Pathway, there is an oxidative stage and a non-oxidative stage. A tetrose sugar, D-erythrose, is utilized in the non-oxidative stage, where D-ribulose 5-phosphate is generated into a 6 carbon sugar (fructose 6-phosphate) and a 3 carbon sugar (glyceraldehyde 3-phosphate). Both of these molecules can be used elsewhere in the body.

D-erythrose 4-phosphate is generated as a product of a reaction called transaldolation. In the Pentose Phosphate Pathway, a transaldolase removes the first 3 carbon molecules of sedoheptulose 7-phosphate and places them onto a glyceraldehyde 3-phosphate. The transaldolase utilizes a Schiff base to perform a reverse aldol reaction and a forward aldol reaction in its mechanism, generating an erythrose 4-phosphate and fructose 6-phosphate. The erythrose 4-phosphate is an important intermediate in the Pentose Phosphate Pathway because it is then used in the final non-oxidative step of the pathway.

The final non-oxidative step of the pathway is a transketolase reaction. A transketolase utilizes a thiamine pyrophosphate, or TPP cofactor, to break the unfavorable bond between the carbon in a carbonyl and the alpha carbon. TPP attacks a xylulose 5-phosphate molecule and facilitates the cleavage of the bond between the C2 (carbonyl carbon) and the C3 (alpha carbon), where glyceraldehyde 3-phosphate is released. Then, C2 can attack erythrose 4-phosphate, which forms fructose 6-phosphate. Both of the products of this reaction can enter the gluconeogenesis pathway to regenerate glucose.

=== Inhibitors of Enzymes ===
A tetrose diphosphate molecule, D-threose 2,4-diphosphate, was discovered to be an inhibitor of glyceraldehyde 3-phosphate dehydrogenase. Glyceraldehyde 3-phosphate dehydrogenase is the sixth enzyme used in the glycolysis pathway, and its function is to convert glyceraldehyde 3-phosphate into 1,3-bisphosphoglycerate. This tetrose diphosphate molecule inhibits the G3P dehydrogenase from performing catalysis because it oxidizes the enzyme by binding to it at the active site. When tetrose diphosphate is bound to the enzyme, the active site of the enzyme is blocked; therefore phosphorolysis of G3P is unable to occur. High concentrations of tetrose diphosphate must be used to outcompete the substrate, G3P, and block the function of G3P dehydrogenase. With the function of glyceraldehyde 3-phosphate dehydrogenase lost, glycolysis cannot proceed.

D-erythrose 4-phosphate was found to be an inhibitor of phosphoglucose isomerase. Phosphoglucose isomerase is the second enzyme in the glycolysis pathway, and its role is to convert glucose 6-phosphate into fructose 6-phosphate.

In both of these cases, the tetrose is an inhibitor of an enzyme in the glycolysis pathway, preventing it from proceeding onward.
