= Transaldolase deficiency =

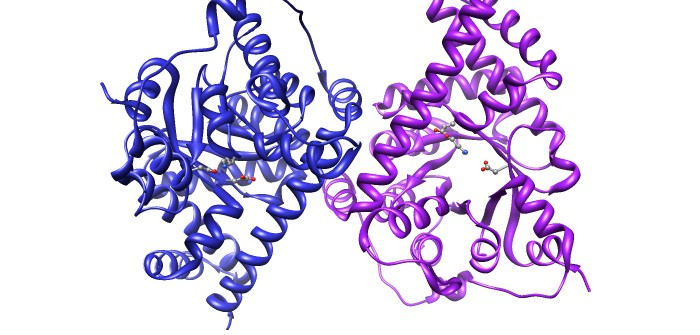
- The structure of the Tranaldolase enzyme.

Transaldolase deficiency is a disease characterised by abnormally low levels of the transaldolase enzyme. It is a metabolic enzyme involved in the pentose phosphate pathway. It is caused by mutation in the transaldolase gene (TALDO1). It was first described by Verhoeven et al. in 2001.

== Signs and symptoms ==
The leading symptoms of Transaldolase Deficiency are coagulopathy, thrombocytopenia, hepatosplenomegaly, hepatic fibrosis and dysmorphic features. The dysmorphic features can include antimongoloid slant, low-set ears, and cutis laxa. Those affected by this disease have abnormal polyol concentrations in urine and other bodily fluids, this can determined by an abnormal liver function tests.

With transaldolase deficiency there is a buildup of sedoheptulose 7-phosphate (it is increased six to sevenfold in the blood compared to normal), which decreases the change of ribose 5-phosphate into glucose 6-phosphate. This reaction is important in releasing NADPH. Reduced glutathione is essential for regulation of Mitochondrial membrane permeability and depends on the NADPH generated from the pentose phosphate pathway to be regenerated from oxidized glutathione. Transaldolase plays an important role in male fertility; this is because it maintains the mitochondrial transmembrane potential and its role in the release NADPH. Therefore, transaldolase deficiency decreases the mobility of spermatozoa and lowers male fertility.

Liver cirrhosis is associated with increased apoptosis of hepatocytes and transaldolase is a regulator in apoptosis signaling processing – therefore transaldolase deficiency can result in liver cirrhosis.

== Causes ==
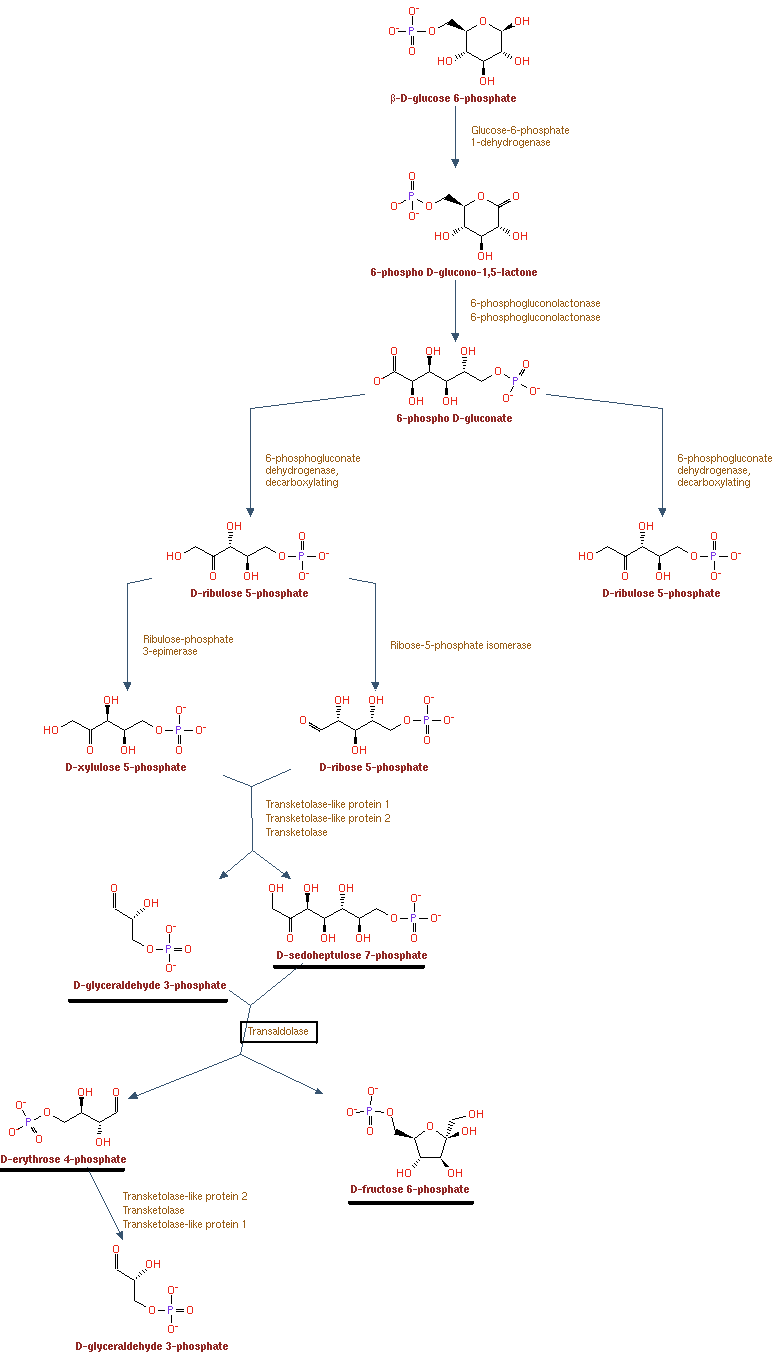
This pentose phosphate pathway in humans with the reaction catalysed by transaldolase underlined.

TALDO1 is either mutated by the deletion of residue Ser171 or a replacement of Arg192 by His or Cys, changing the formation of the protein. The deletion of Ser171 leads to inactivation and proteasome-mediated degradation of TALDO1.

This shows the pentose phosphate pathway in humans with transaldolase catalysing the following reaction:

D-glyceraldehyde 3-phosphate + D-sedoheptulose 7-phosphate <=> D-fructose 6-phosphate + D-erythrose 4-phosphate

== Diagnosis ==
There are two different techniques for the diagnosis of Transaldolase deficiency.

=== Metabolite Analyses ===
Autozygome analysis and biochemical evaluations of urinary sugars and polyols can be used to diagnose Transaldolase Deficiency. Two specific methods for measuring the urinary sugars and polyols are liquid chromatographytandem mass spectrometry and gas chromatography with flame ionization detection.

=== Mutation Analysis ===
Direct sequence analysis of genomic DNA from blood can be used to perform a mutation analysis for the TALDO1 gene responsible for the Transaldolase enzyme.

== Treatment ==
At this time there is no treatment for transaldolase deficiency.

There is currently research being done to find treatments for transaldolase deficiency. A study done in 2009 used orally administered N-acetylcysteine on transaldolase deficient mice and it prevented the symptoms associated with the disease. N-acetylcysteine is a precursor for reduced glutathione, which is decreased in transaldolase deficient patients.

== Epidemiology ==
Transaldolase deficiency is recognized as a rare inherited pleiotropic metabolic disorder first recognized and described in 2001 that is autosomal recessive. There have been only a few cases that have been noted, as of 2012 there have been 9 patients recognized with this disease and one fetus.

== See also ==
Transaldolase

Inborn error of metabolism

Pentose phosphate pathway

Glucose-6-phosphate dehydrogenase deficiency
