= Phosphopentose epimerase =

Class of enzymes

ribulose-phosphate 3-epimerase
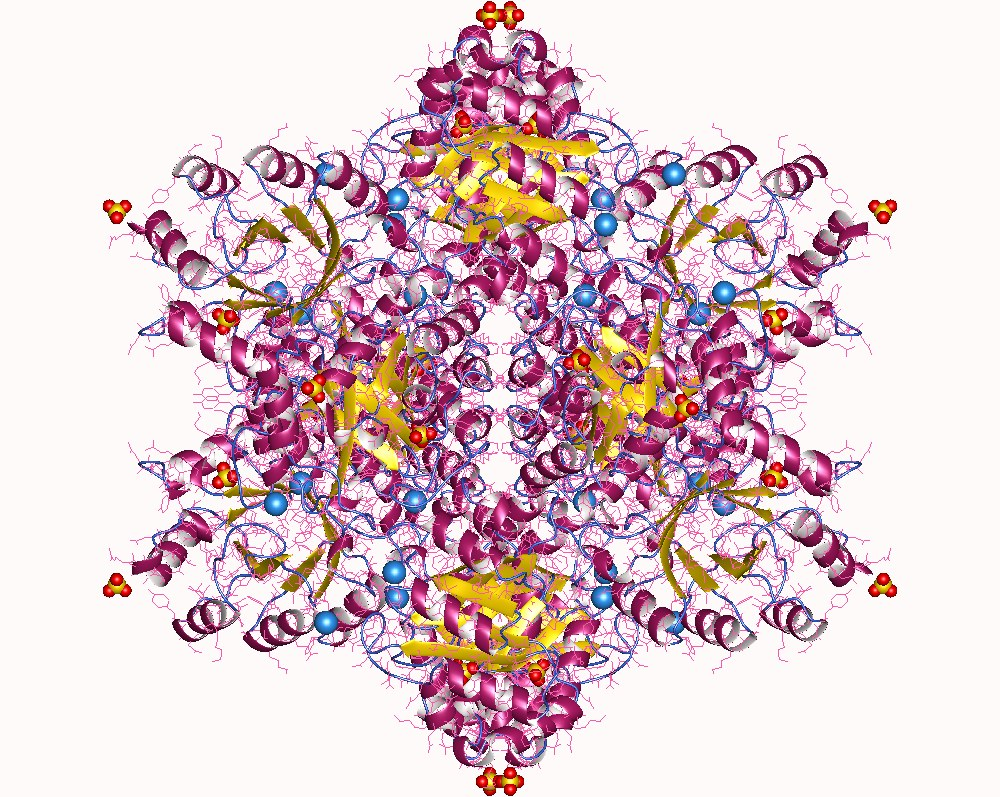
- D-ribulose-5-phosphate 3-epimerase dodekamer, Francisella tularensis

Identifiers
- EC no.: 5.1.3.1
- CAS no.: 9024-20-8

Databases
- BRENDA: enzyme data
- ExPASy: NiceZyme view
- KEGG: enzyme entry
- MetaCyc: metabolic pathway
- Rhea: reactions
- PDB structures: RCSB PDB PDBe PDBsum
- Gene Ontology: AmiGO / QuickGO
Search
- PMC: articles
- PubMed: articles
- NCBI: proteins

Ribulose-phosphate 3 epimerase family

Identifiers
- Symbol: Ribul_P_3_epim
- Pfam: PF00834
- InterPro: IPR000056
- PROSITE: PDOC00833
- SCOP2: 1rpx / SCOPe / SUPFAM
Available protein structures:
- PDB: 1tqjB:6-208 1rpxA:58-260 1h1zA:8-208 1h1yB:8-208 1tqxA:7-208 IPR000056 PF00834 (ECOD; PDBsum)
- AlphaFold: IPR000056; PF00834

Phosphopentose epimerase (also known as ribulose-phosphate 3-epimerase and ribulose 5-phosphate 3-epimerase, EC 5.1.3.1) encoded in humans by the RPE gene is a metalloprotein that catalyzes the interconversion between D-ribulose 5-phosphate and D-xylulose 5-phosphate.

D-ribulose 5-phosphate $\rightleftharpoons$ D-xylulose 5-phosphate

This reversible conversion is required for carbon fixation in plants – through the Calvin cycle – and for the nonoxidative phase of the pentose phosphate pathway. This enzyme has also been implicated in additional pentose and glucuronate interconversions.

In Cupriavidus metallidurans two copies of the gene coding for PPE are known, one is chromosomally encoded P40117, the other one is on a plasmid Q04539. PPE has been found in a wide range of bacteria, archaebacteria, fungi and plants. All the proteins have from 209 to 241 amino acid residues. The enzyme has a TIM barrel structure.

== Nomenclature ==
The systematic name of this enzyme class is D-ribulose-5-phosphate 3-epimerase. Other names in common use include

- phosphoribulose epimerase,
- erythrose-4-phosphate isomerase,
- phosphoketopentose 3-epimerase,
- xylulose phosphate 3-epimerase,
- phosphoketopentose epimerase,
- ribulose 5-phosphate 3-epimerase,
- D-ribulose phosphate-3-epimerase,
- D-ribulose 5-phosphate epimerase,
- D-ribulose-5-P 3-epimerase,
- D-xylulose-5-phosphate 3-epimerase, and
- pentose-5-phosphate 3-epimerase.

This enzyme participates in 3 metabolic pathways: pentose phosphate pathway, pentose and glucuronate interconversions, and carbon fixation.

The human protein containing this domain is the RPE (gene).

== Family ==
Phosphopentose epimerase belongs to two protein families of increasing hierarchy. This enzyme belongs to the isomerase family, specifically those racemases and epimerases which act on carbohydrates and their derivatives. In addition, the Structural Classification of Proteins database has defined the “ribulose phosphate binding” superfamily for which this epimerase is a member. Other proteins included in this superfamily are 5‘-monophosphate decarboxylase (OMPDC), and 3-keto-l-gulonate 6-phosphate decarboxylase (KGPDC).

== Structure ==
As of late 2007, 4 structures have been solved for this class of enzymes, with PDB accession codes PDB: 1H1Y, PDB: 1H1Z, PDB: 1RPX, and PDB: 1TQJ.

=== Overall ===
Crystallographic studies have helped elucidate the apoenzyme structure of phosphopentose epimerase. Results of these studies have shown that this enzyme exists as a homodimer in solution. Furthermore, Phosphopentose epimerase folds into a (β/α)_{8} triosephosphate isomerase (TIM) barrel that includes loops. The core barrel is composed of 8 parallel strands that make up the central beta sheet, with helices located in between consecutive strands. The loops in this structure have been known to regulate substrate specificities. Specifically, the loop that connects helix α6 with strand β6 caps the active site upon binding of the substrate.

As previously mentioned, Phosphopentose epimerase is a metalloenzyme. It requires a cofactor for functionality and binds one divalent metal cation per subunit. This enzyme has been shown to use Zn^{2+} predominantly for catalysis, along with Co^{2+} and Mn^{2+}. However, human phosphopentose epimerase – which is encoded by the RPE gene - differs in that it binds Fe^{2+} predominantly in catalysis. Fe^{2+} is octahedrally coordinated and stabilizes the 2,3-enediolate reaction intermediate observed in the figure.

=== Active site ===
The β6/α6 loop region interacts with the substrate and regulates access to the active site. Phe147, Gly148, and Ala149 of this region cap the active site once binding has occurred. In addition, the Fe^{2+} ion is coordinated to His35, His70, Asp37, Asp175, and oxygens O2 and O3 of the substrate. The binding of substrate atoms to the iron cation helps stabilize the complex during catalysis. Mutagenesis studies have also indicated that two aspartic acids are located within the active site and help mediate catalysis through a 1,1-proton transfer reaction. The aspartic acids are the acid/base catalysts. Lastly, once the ligand is attached to the active site, a series of methionines (Met39, Met72, and Met141) restrict further movement through constriction.

== Mechanism ==
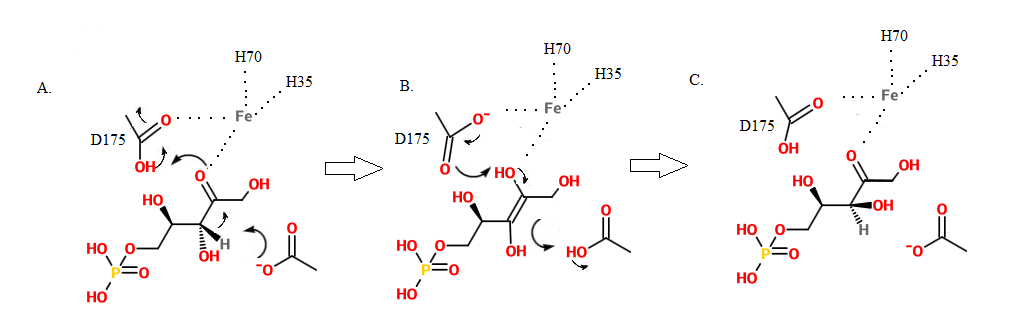
This is a mechanism by which phosphopentose epimerase converts ribulose 5-phosphate to xylulose 5-phosphate. The intermediate in 2,3-trans-enediolate.

Phosphopentose utilizes an acid/base type of catalytic mechanism. The reaction proceeds in such a way that trans-2,3-enediol phosphate is the intermediate. The two aspartic acids mentioned above act as proton donors and acceptors. Asp37 and Asp175 are both hydrogen bonded to the iron cation in the active site. When Asp37 is deprotonated, it attacks a proton on the third carbon of D-ribulose 5-phosphate, which forms the intermediate. In a concerted step, as Asp37 grabs a proton, the carbonyl bond on the substrate grabs a second proton from Asp175 to form a hydroxyl group. The iron complex helps stabilize any additional charges. It is C3 of D-ribulose 5-phosphate which undergoes this epimerization, forming D-xylulose 5-phosphate. The mechanism is clearly demonstrated in the figure.

== Function ==
=== Calvin cycle ===
Electron microscopy experiments in plants have shown that phosphopentose epimerase localizes to the thylakoid membrane of chloroplasts. This epimerase participates in the third phase of the Calvin cycle, which involves the regeneration of ribulose 1,5-bisphosphate. RuBP is the acceptor of the carbon dioxide (CO_{2}) in the first step of the pathway, which suggests that phosphopentose epimerase regulates flux through the Calvin cycle. Without the regeneration of ribulose 1,5-bisphosphate, the cycle will be unable to continue. Therefore, xylulose 5-phosphate is reversibly converted into ribulose 5-phosphate by this epimerase. Subsequently, phosphoribulose kinase converts ribulose 5-phosphate into ribulose 1,5-bisphosphate.

=== Pentose phosphate pathway ===
The reactions of the pentose phosphate pathway (PPP) take place in the cytoplasm. Phosphopentose epimerase specifically affects the nonoxidative portion of the pathway, which involves the production of various sugars and precursors. This enzyme converts ribulose 5-phosphate into the appropriate epimer for the transketolase reaction, xylulose 5-phosphate. Therefore, the reaction that occurs in the pentose phosphate pathway is exactly the reverse of the reaction which occurs in the Calvin cycle. The mechanism remains the same and involves the formation of an enediolate intermediate.

Due to its involvement in this pathway, phosphopentose epimerase is an important enzyme for the cellular response to oxidative stress. The generation of NADPH by the pentose phosphate pathway helps protect cells against reactive oxygen species. NADPH is able to reduce glutathione, which detoxifies the body by producing water from hydrogen peroxide (H_{2}O_{2}). Therefore, not only does phosphopentose epimerase alter flux through the PPP, but it also prevents buildup of peroxides.

== Evolution ==
The structures of many phosphopentose epimerase analogs have been discovered through crystallographic studies. Due to its role in the Calvin cycle and the pentose phosphate pathway, the overall structure is conserved. When the sequences of evolutionarily-distant organisms were compared, greater than 50% similarity was observed. However, amino acids positioned at the dimer interface – which are involved in many intermolecular interactions – are not necessarily conserved. The members of the “ribulose phosphate binding” superfamily resulted from divergent evolution from a (β/α)_{8} - barrel ancestor.

== Drug targeting and malaria ==
The protozoan organism Plasmodium falciparum is a major causative agent of malaria. Phosphopentose epimerase has been implicated in the shikimate pathway, an essential pathway for the propagation of malaria. As the enzyme converts ribulose 5-phosphate into xylulose 5-phosphate, the latter is further metabolized into erythrose 4-phosphate. The shikimate pathway then converts erythrose 4-phosphate into chorismate. It is phosphopentose epimerase which allows Plasmodium falciparum to use erythorse 4-phosphate as a substrate. Due to this enzyme’s involvement in the shikimate pathway, phosphopentose epimerase is a potential drug target for developing antimalarials.

== See also ==
- Phosphopentose Isomerase
- Phosphoribulose Kinase
- Pentose Phosphate Pathway
- TIM barrel
- RPE (human gene encoding Ribulose-phosphate 3-epimerase)
