= C5H11O8P =

The molecular formula C_{5}H_{11}O_{8}P (molar mass: 230.11 g/mol, exact mass: 230.0192 u) may refer to:

- Ribulose 5-phosphate
- Ribose 5-phosphate
- Xylulose 5-phosphate (D-xylulose-5-P)
