= Sedoheptulokinase =

Identifiers
- EC no.: 2.7.1.14
- CAS no.: 9030-63-1

Databases
- BRENDA: enzyme data
- ExPASy: NiceZyme view
- KEGG: enzyme entry
- MetaCyc: metabolic pathway
- Rhea: reactions
- PDB structures: RCSB PDB PDBe PDBsum
- Gene Ontology: AmiGO / QuickGO
Search
- PMC: articles
- PubMed: articles
- NCBI: proteins

Sedoheptulokinase (EC 2.7.1.14) is an enzyme that catalyzes the chemical reaction

ATP +
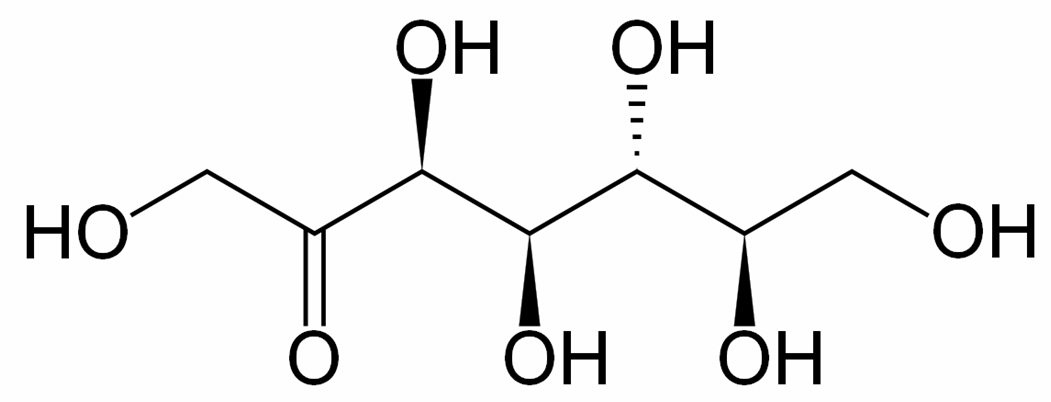
sedoheptulose
ADP +
sedoheptulose 7-phosphate

The enzyme converts the heptose sugar, sedoheptulose, to sedoheptulose 7-phosphate by transferring a phosphate group from the cofactor, adenosine triphosphate (ATP), which is converted to adenosine diphosphate (ADP).

This enzyme is a transferase, specifically one transferring phosphorus-containing groups (phosphotransferases) with an alcohol group as acceptor. The systematic name of this enzyme class is ATP:sedoheptulose 7-phosphotransferase. Other names in common use include heptulokinase, and sedoheptulokinase (phosphorylating).
