= Ferredoxin-thioredoxin reductase =

Ferredoxin thioredoxin reductase variable alpha chain
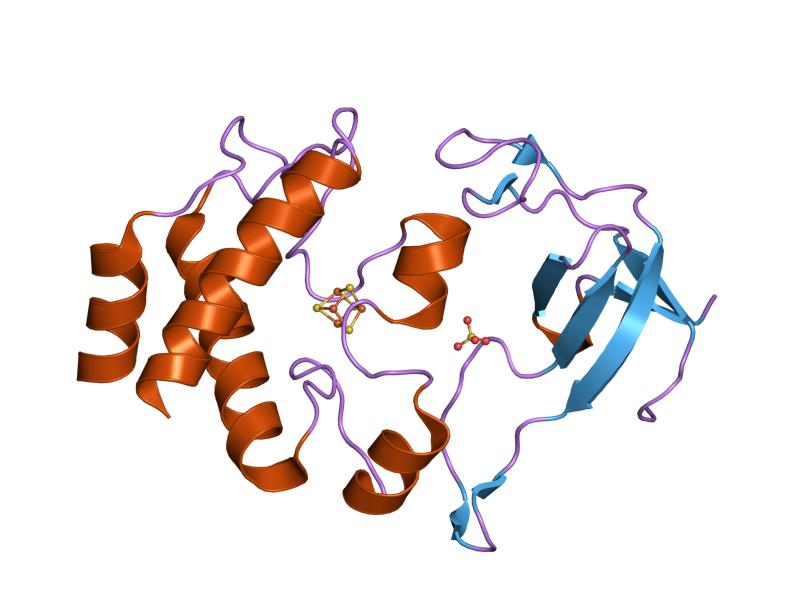
- crystal structure of ferredoxin thioredoxin reductase

Identifiers
- Symbol: FeThRed_A
- Pfam: PF02941
- InterPro: IPR004207
- SCOP2: 1dj7 / SCOPe / SUPFAM
Available protein structures:
- PDB: IPR004207 PF02941 (ECOD; PDBsum)
- AlphaFold: IPR004207; PF02941

Ferredoxin thioredoxin reductase catalytic beta chain
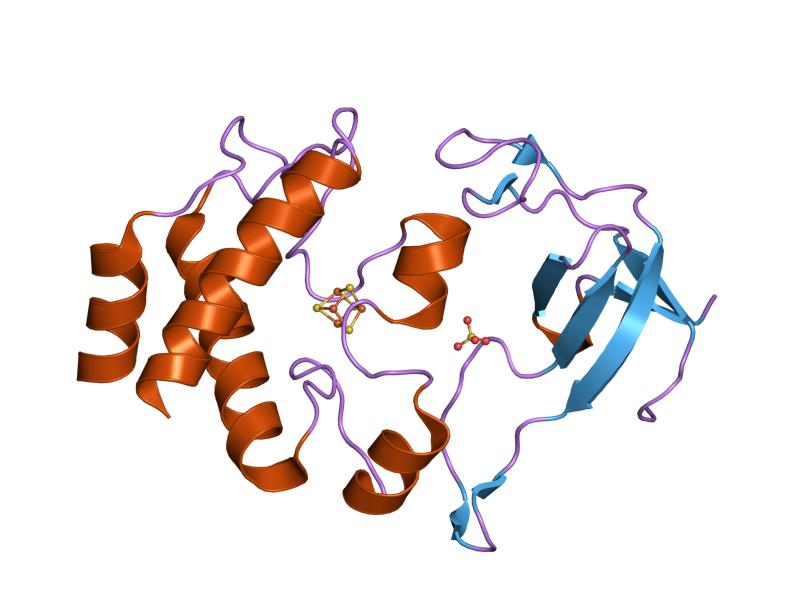
- crystal structure of ferredoxin thioredoxin reductase

Identifiers
- Symbol: FeThRed_B
- Pfam: PF02943
- InterPro: IPR004209
- SCOP2: 1dj7 / SCOPe / SUPFAM
Available protein structures:
- PDB: IPR004209 PF02943 (ECOD; PDBsum)
- AlphaFold: IPR004209; PF02943

Ferredoxin-thioredoxin reductase EC 1.8.7.2, systematic name ferredoxin:thioredoxin disulfide oxidoreductase, is a [4Fe-4S] protein that plays an important role in the ferredoxin/thioredoxin regulatory chain. It catalyzes the following reaction:

2 reduced ferredoxin + thioredoxin disulfide $\rightleftharpoons$ 2 oxidized ferredoxin + thioredoxin thiols + 2 H^{+}

Ferredoxin-Thioredoxin reductase (FTR) converts an electron signal (photoreduced ferredoxin) to a thiol signal (reduced thioredoxin), regulating enzymes by reduction of specific disulfide groups. It catalyses the light-dependent activation of several photosynthesis enzymes and constitutes the first historical example of a thiol/disulfide exchange cascade for enzyme regulation. It is a heterodimer of subunit alpha and subunit beta. Subunit alpha is the variable subunit, and beta is the catalytic chain. The structure of the beta subunit has been determined and found to fold around the FeS cluster.

== Biological Function ==
Major groups of oxygen-producing, photosynthetic organisms such as cyanobacteria, algae, C4, C3, and crassulacean acid metabolism (CAM) plants use Ferredoxin-thioredoxin reductase for carbon fixation regulation. FTR, as part of a greater Ferredoxin-Thioredoxin system, allows plants to change their metabolism based on light intensity. Specifically, the Ferredoxin-Thioredoxin system controls enzymes in the Calvin Cycle and Pentose phosphate pathway - allowing plants to balance carbohydrate synthesis and degradation based on the availability of light. In the light, photosynthesis harnesses light energy and reduces Ferredoxin. Using FTR, reduced Ferredoxin then reduces Thioredoxin. Thioredoxin, through thiol/disulfide exchange, then activates carbohydrate synthesis enzymes such as chloroplast fructose-1,6-bisphosphatase, Sedoheptulose-bisphosphatase, and phosphoribulokinase. As a result, light uses FTR to activate carbohydrate biosynthesis. In the dark, Ferredoxin remains oxidized. This leaves Thioredoxin inactive and allows carbohydrate breakdown to dominate metabolism.

== Structure ==
Ferredoxin-Thioredoxin Reductase is an α-β heterodimer of approximately 30 kDa. FTR structure across different plant species include a conserved catalytic β subunit and a variable α subunit. The structure of FTR from Synechocystis sp. PCC6803 has been studied in detail and resolved at 1.6 Å. FTR resembles a thin concave disc, 10 Å across the center where a [4Fe-4S cluster] resides. One side of the cluster center contains redox-active disulfide bonds that reduce Thioredoxin while the opposite docks with reduced Ferredoxin. This two sided disc structure allows FTR to simultaneously interact with Thioredoxin and Ferredoxin.

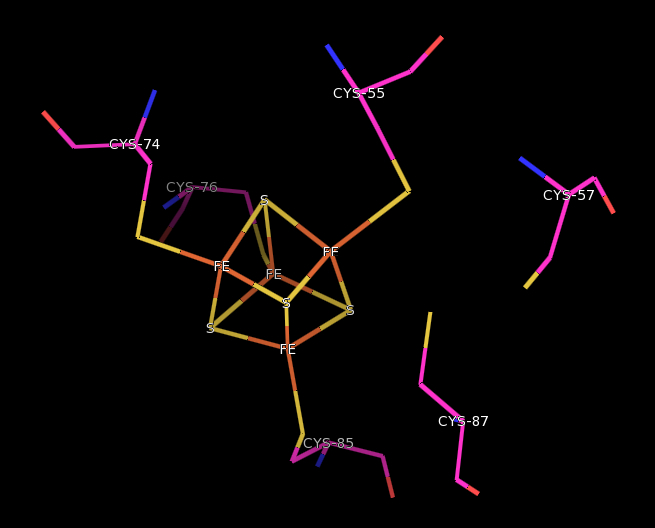
[4Fe-4S] cluster in the Ferredoxin-thioredoxin reductase catalytic β subunit is surrounded by several Cysteine residues.

The variable α subunit has an open β barrel structure made of five antiparallel β strands. Its interaction with the catalytic subunit occurs mainly with two loops between β strands. The residues in these two loops are mostly conserved and are thought to stabilize the 4Fe-4S cluster in the catalytic subunit. Structurally, the α subunit is very similar to the PsaE protein, a subunit of Photosystem I, though the similarity is not seen in their sequences or functions.

The catalytic β subunit has a general α-helical structure with an [4Fe-4S center]. The FeS center and redox-active Cysteine residues are located within the loops of these helices. Cysteine-55, 74, 76, and 85 are coordinated to the iron atoms of the cubane-type cluster.

== Enzymatic Mechanism ==
FTR is unique among thioredoxin reductases because it uses an Fe-S cluster cofactor rather than flavoproteins to reduce disulfide bonds. FTR catalysis begins with its interaction with reduced Ferredoxin. This proceeds with the attraction between FTR Lys-47 and Ferredoxin Glu-92. One electron from Ferredoxin and one electron from the Fe-S center is abstracted to break FTR's Cys-87 and Cys-57 disulfide bond, create a nucleophilic Cys-57, and oxidize the Fe-S center from [4Fe-4S]^{2+} to [4Fe-4S]^{3+}. The structure of this one-electron (from Ferredoxin) intermediate is contested: Staples et al. suggest Cys-87 is coordinated to a Sulfur in the Fe-S center while Dai et al. argue Cys-87 is coordinated to an Iron. Next, the nucleophilic Cys-57, encouraged by an adjacent Histidine residue, attacks a disulfide bridge on Thioredoxin, creating a hetero-disulfide Thioredoxin intermediate. Lastly, a newly docked Ferredoxin molecule delivers the final electron to the FeS center, reducing it to its original 2+ state, reforming the Cys-87, Cys-57 disulfide, and fully reducing thioredoxin to two thiols.
