= Inosinate nucleosidase =

Class of enzyme

Identifiers
- EC no.: 3.2.2.12
- CAS no.: 37288-61-2

Databases
- BRENDA: enzyme data
- ExPASy: NiceZyme view
- KEGG: enzyme entry
- MetaCyc: metabolic pathway
- Rhea: reactions
- PDB structures: RCSB PDB PDBe PDBsum
- Gene Ontology: AmiGO / QuickGO
Search
- PMC: articles
- PubMed: articles
- NCBI: proteins

Inosinate nucleosidase (EC 3.2.2.12) is an enzyme characterised from Aspergillus species that catalyses the hydrolysis of the nucleotide, inosinic acid, to D-ribose 5-phosphate and hypoxanthine:

inosinic acid
H_{2}O
D-ribose 5-phosphate
+
hypoxanthine

This enzyme is a hydrolase, specifically a glycosylase that hydrolyses N-glycosyl compounds. The systematic name of this enzyme class is 5'-inosinate phosphoribohydrolase.
