= Erythrose =

- Haworth projection of alpha-D-erythrofuranose

- D-Erythrose

- L-Erythrose

Names
- IUPAC names D-Erythrose; D-erythro-Tetrose (systematic name)
- Systematic IUPAC name (2R,3R)-2,3,4-Trihydroxybutanal (D) (2S,3S)-2,3,4-Trihydroxybutanal (L)

Identifiers
CAS Number	583-50-6 (D); 533-49-3 (L)
3D model (JSmol)	(D): Interactive image; (L): Interactive image
Beilstein Reference	5805561
ChEBI	CHEBI:27904
ChemSpider	84990 (D)
ECHA InfoCard	100.008.643
EC Number	209-505-2
KEGG	C01796
PubChem CID	94176 (D)
UNII	X3EI0WE8Q4 (D); 96DH71781X (L)
CompTox Dashboard (EPA)	DTXSID601318240
- InChI: InChI=1S/C4H8O4/c5-1-3(7)4(8)2-6/h1,3-4,6-8H,2H2/t3-,4+/m0/s1 Key: YTBSYETUWUMLBZ-IUYQGCFVSA-N; InChI=1/C4H8O4/c5-1-3(7)4(8)2-6/h1,3-4,6-8H,2H2/t3-,4+/m0/s1 Key: YTBSYETUWUMLBZ-IUYQGCFVBI
- SMILES: (D): OC[C@@H](O)[C@@H](O)C=O; (L): OC[C@H](O)[C@H](O)C=O

Properties
Chemical formula	C_{4}H_{8}O_{4}
Molar mass	120.104 g·mol^{−1}
Appearance	Light yellow syrup
Solubility in water	highly soluble

Hazards
NFPA 704 (fire diamond)	1 1 0
- Except where otherwise noted, data are given for materials in their standard state (at 25 °C [77 °F], 100 kPa). verify (what is ?) Infobox references

Erythrose is a tetrose saccharide with the chemical formula C_{4}H_{8}O_{4}. It has one aldehyde group, and is thus part of the aldose family. The natural isomer is D-erythrose; it is a diastereomer of D-threose.

Fischer projections depicting the two enantiomers of erythrose

Erythrose was named after the sugar alcohol erythritol (Erythrit), from which it was first synthesized in 1887 by Emil Fischer and Julius Tafel.

Erythrose 4-phosphate is an intermediate in the pentose phosphate pathway and the Calvin cycle.

Oxidative bacteria can be made to use erythrose as its sole energy source.

Although often inconsequential, erythrose in aqueous solution mainly exists as the hydrate owing to the following equilibrium:

HOCH_{2}CH(OH)CH(OH)CHO + H_{2}O ⇌ HOCH_{2}CH(OH)CH(OH)CH(OH)_{2}

== Unrelated compound ==
An unrelated compound, initially also named "erythrose", was isolated in 1849 from nitrated rhubarb by the French pharmacist Louis-Félix-Joseph Garot (1798–1869), and was named as such because of its red hue in the presence of alkali metals (ἐρυθρός, "red").. This unrelated substance from rhubarb is identical to the nitrated anthraquinone chrysaminic acid (Chrysaminsäure, 517-92-0 ).

== See also ==
- Erythritol
- Erythrulose
