= RPE =

RPE is a three letter acronym, which can refer to:

- Radiation protection expert
- Rapid palatal expander, an orthodontic device widen the palate
- Rating of perceived exertion, a scale for assessing perceived exertion during exercise
- IBM Rational Publishing Engine, a document generation solution
- Red Pine Elementary in Eagan, Minnesota, USA
- Respiratory protective equipment
- Retinal pigment epithelium — layer of the retina
- Revenue Per Employee, a ratio used to compare business efficiency
- Ribulose-phosphate epimerase, human gene for a protein that reversibly converts ribulose to xyulose
- Rocket Propulsion Establishment, UK-based military research site at RAF Westcott
- Russet Potato Exchange in Bancroft, Wisconsin, USA
- Radical Performance Engines a UK company that builds Race car and tuned Hayabusa Motorcycle Engines
