= Pyrimidine-5'-nucleotide nucleosidase =

Class of enzymes

Identifiers
- EC no.: 3.2.2.10
- CAS no.: 9023-31-8

Databases
- BRENDA: enzyme data
- ExPASy: NiceZyme view
- KEGG: enzyme entry
- MetaCyc: metabolic pathway
- Rhea: reactions
- PDB structures: RCSB PDB PDBe PDBsum
- Gene Ontology: AmiGO / QuickGO
Search
- PMC: articles
- PubMed: articles
- NCBI: proteins

Pyrimidine-5'-nucleotide nucleosidase (EC 3.2.2.10) is an enzyme that catalyzes the general chemical reaction

a pyrimidine 5'-nucleotide + H_{2}O $\rightleftharpoons$ D-ribose 5-phosphate + a pyrimidine base

For example, the enzyme characterised from Streptomyces species hydrolyses the nucleotide, cytidine monophosphate, to D-ribose 5-phosphate and cytosine:

cytidine monophosphate
H_{2}O
D-ribose 5-phosphate
+
cytosine

The enzyme is also found in plants. It is a hydrolase, specifically a glycosylase that hydrolyses N-glycosyl compounds. The systematic name of this enzyme class is pyrimidine-5'-nucleotide phosphoribo(deoxyribo)hydrolase. Other names in common use include pyrimidine nucleotide N-ribosidase, and Pyr5N.
