= Lipopolysaccharide kinase (Kdo/WaaP) family =

Family of kinases

Kdo

Identifiers
- Symbol: Kdo
- Pfam: PF06293
- Pfam clan: CL0016
- InterPro: IPR010440
Available protein structures:
- Pfam: structures / ECOD
- PDB: RCSB PDB; PDBe; PDBj
- PDBsum: structure summary

In molecular biology, the lipopolysaccharide kinase (Kdo/WaaP) family is a family of lipopolysaccharide kinases that includes lipopolysaccharide core heptose(I) kinase rfaP (encoded by the waaP (rfaP) gene). Lipopolysaccharide core heptose(I) kinase rfaP is required for the addition of phosphate to O-4 of the first heptose residue of the lipopolysaccharide (LPS) inner core region. It has previously been shown that it is necessary for resistance to hydrophobic and polycationic antimicrobials in E. coli and that it is required for virulence in invasive strains of Salmonella enterica. The family also includes 3-deoxy-D-manno-octulosonic acid kinase (KDO kinase) from Haemophilus influenzae, which phosphorylates Kdo-lipid IV(A), a lipopolysaccharide precursor, and is involved in virulence.
