= Ribose-5-phosphate adenylyltransferase =

Class of enzymes

Identifiers
- EC no.: 2.7.7.35
- CAS no.: 9054-55-1

Databases
- IntEnz: IntEnz view
- BRENDA: BRENDA entry
- ExPASy: NiceZyme view
- KEGG: KEGG entry
- MetaCyc: metabolic pathway
- PRIAM: profile
- PDB structures: RCSB PDB PDBe PDBsum
- Gene Ontology: AmiGO / QuickGO
Search
- PMC: articles
- PubMed: articles
- NCBI: proteins

Ribose-5-phosphate adenylyltransferase (EC 2.7.7.35) is an enzyme that catalyzes the irreversible chemical reaction

adenosine diphosphate ribose
P_{i}
adenosine diphosphate
+
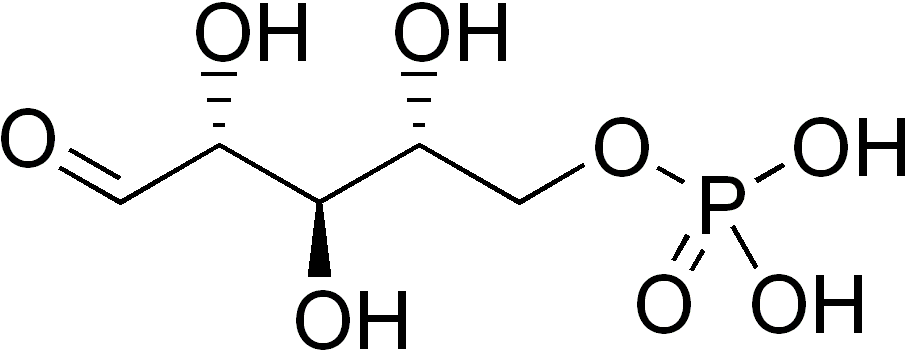
ribose 5-phosphate

The enzyme characterised from Euglena gracilis breaks down adenosine diphosphate ribose with orthophosphate (P_{i}) to give adenosine diphosphate and ribose 5-phosphate (shown in its open-chain aldehydo form).

This enzyme is a transferase, specifically one transferring phosphorus-containing nucleotide groups (nucleotidyltransferases). The systematic name of this enzyme class is ADP:D-ribose-5-phosphate adenylyltransferase. Other names in common use include ADP ribose phosphorylase, and adenosine diphosphoribose phosphorylase.
