= Sedoheptulose-bisphosphatase =

Class of enzymes

sedoheptulose-bisphosphatase
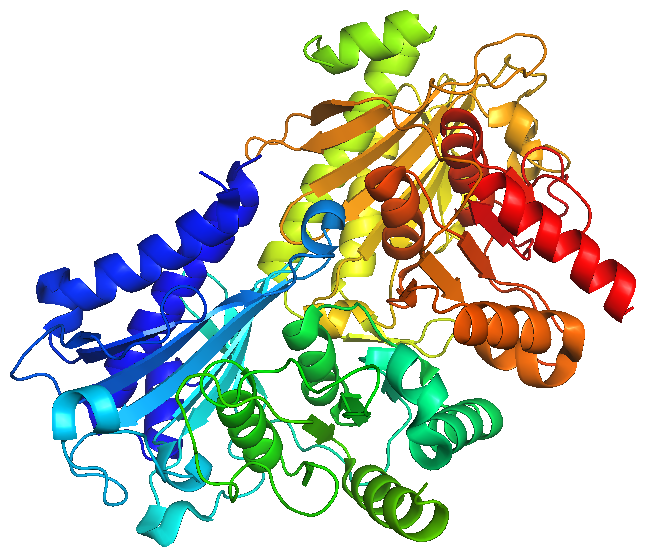
- Crystallographic structure of sedoheptulose-bisphosphatase from Toxoplasma gondii

Identifiers
- EC no.: 3.1.3.37
- CAS no.: 9055-32-7

Databases
- BRENDA: enzyme data
- ExPASy: NiceZyme view
- KEGG: enzyme entry
- MetaCyc: metabolic pathway
- Rhea: reactions
- PDB structures: RCSB PDB PDBe PDBsum
- Gene Ontology: AmiGO / QuickGO
Search
- PMC: articles
- PubMed: articles
- NCBI: proteins

Sedoheptulose-bisphosphatase (also sedoheptulose-1,7-bisphosphatase or SBPase, EC number 3.1.3.37; systematic name sedoheptulose-1,7-bisphosphate 1-phosphohydrolase) is an enzyme that catalyzes the removal of a phosphate group from sedoheptulose 1,7-bisphosphate to produce sedoheptulose 7-phosphate. SBPase is an example of a phosphatase, or, more generally, a hydrolase. This enzyme participates in the Calvin cycle.

== Structure ==
SBPase is a homodimeric protein, meaning that it is made up of two identical subunits. The size of this protein varies between species, but is about 92,000 Da (two 46,000 Da subunits) in cucumber plant leaves. The key functional domain controlling SBPase function involves a disulfide bond between two cysteine residues. These two cysteine residues, Cys52 and Cys57, appear to be located in a flexible loop between the two subunits of the homodimer, near the active site of the enzyme. Reduction of this regulatory disulfide bond by thioredoxin incites a conformational change in the active site, activating the enzyme. Additionally, SBPase requires the presence of magnesium (Mg^{2+}) to be functionally active. SBPase is bound to the stroma-facing side of the thylakoid membrane in the chloroplast in a plant. Some studies have suggested the SBPase may be part of a large (900 kDa) multi-enzyme complex along with a number of other photosynthetic enzymes.

== Regulation ==
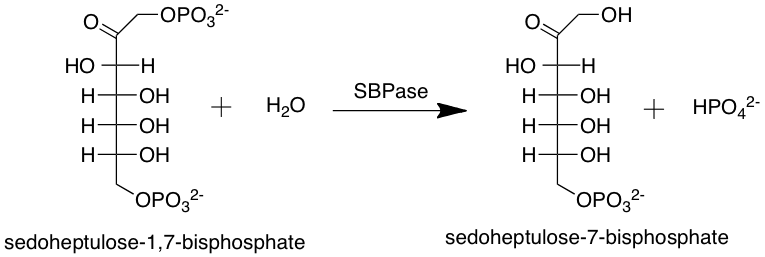
Reaction catalyzed by sedoheptulose-bisphosphatase

SBPase is involved in the regeneration of 5-carbon sugars during the Calvin cycle. Although SBPase has not been emphasized as an important control point in the Calvin cycle historically, it plays a large part in controlling the flux of carbon through the Calvin cycle. Additionally, SBPase activity has been found to have a strong correlation with the amount of photosynthetic carbon fixation. Like many Calvin cycle enzymes, SBPase is activated in the presence of light through a ferredoxin/thioredoxin system. In the light reactions of photosynthesis, light energy powers the transport of electrons to eventually reduce ferredoxin. The enzyme ferredoxin-thioredoxin reductase uses reduced ferredoxin to reduce thioredoxin from the disulfide form to the dithiol. Finally, the reduced thioredoxin is used to reduced a cysteine-cysteine disulfide bond in SBPase to a dithiol, which converts the SBPase into its active form.

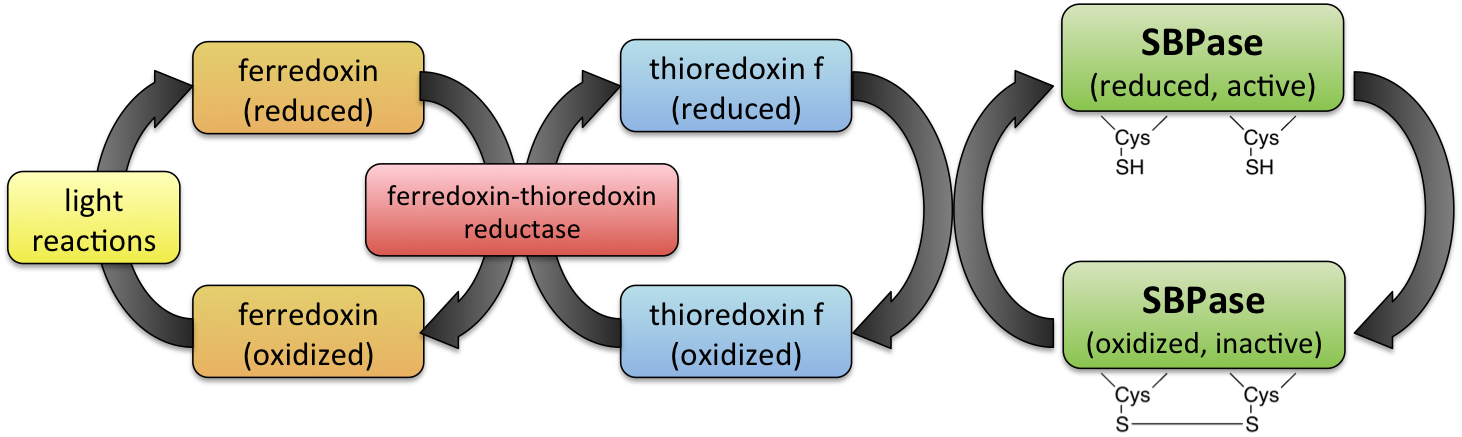
This is an illustration of the regulation of SBPase by ferredoxin and thioredoxin.

SBPase has additional levels of regulation beyond the ferredoxin/thioredoxin system. Mg2+ concentration has a significant impact on the activity of SBPase and the rate of the reactions it catalyzes. SBPase is inhibited by acidic conditions (low pH). This is a large contributor to the overall inhibition of carbon fixation when the pH is low inside the stroma of the chloroplast. Finally, SBPase is subject to negative feedback regulation by sedoheptulose-7-phosphate and inorganic phosphate, the products of the reaction it catalyzes.

== Evolutionary origin ==
SBPase and FBPase (fructose-1,6-bisphosphatase, EC 3.1.3.11) are both phosphatases that catalyze similar during the Calvin cycle. The genes for SBPase and FBPase are related. Both genes are found in the nucleus in plants, and have bacterial ancestry. SBPase is found across many species. In addition to being universally present in photosynthetic organism, SBPase is found in a number of evolutionarily-related, non-photosynthetic microorganisms. SBPase likely originated in red algae.

== Horticultural Relevance ==
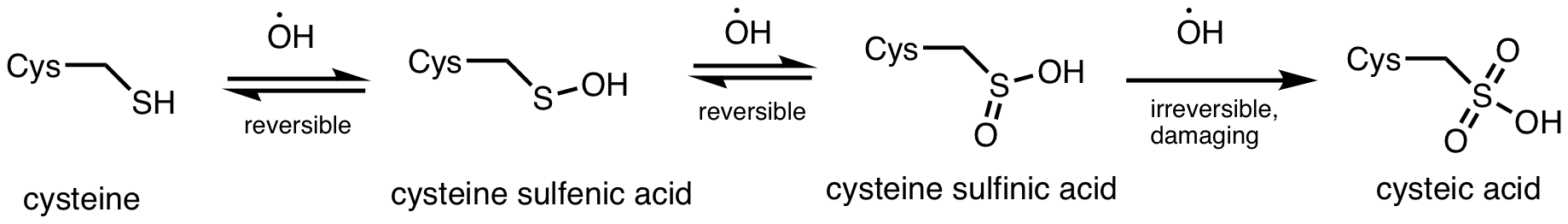
Carbonylation of a cysteine residue via hydroxyl radical, analogous to how SBPase is inactivated by ROS.

Moreso than other enzymes in the Calvin cycle, SBPase levels have a significant impact on plant growth, photosynthetic ability, and response to environmental stresses. Small decreases in SBPase activity result in decreased photosynthetic carbon fixation and reduced plant biomass. Specifically, decreased SBPase levels result in stunted plant organ growth and development compared to wild-type plants, and starch levels decrease linearly with decreases in SBPase activity, suggesting that SBPase activity is a limiting factor to carbon assimilation. This sensitivity of plants to decreased SBPase activity is significant, as SBPase itself is sensitive to oxidative damage and inactivation from environmental stresses. SBPase contains several catalytically relevant cysteine residues that are vulnerable to irreversible oxidative carbonylation by reactive oxygen species (ROS), particularly from hydroxyl radicals created during the production of hydrogen peroxide. Carbonylation results in SBPase enzyme inactivation and subsequent growth retardation due to inhibition of carbon assimilation. Oxidative carbonylation of SBPase can be induced by environmental pressures such as chilling, which causes an imbalance in metabolic processes leading to increased production of reactive oxygen species, particularly hydrogen peroxide. Notably, chilling inhibits SBPase and a related enzyme, fructose bisphosphatase, but does not affect other reductively activated Calvin cycle enzymes.

The sensitivity of plants to synthetically reduced or inhibited SBPase levels provides an opportunity for crop engineering. There are significant indications that transgenic plants which overexpress SBPase may be useful in improving food production efficiency by producing crops that are more resilient to environmental stresses, as well as have earlier maturation and higher yield. Overexpression of SBPase in transgenic tomato plants provided resistance to chilling stress, with the transgenic plants maintaining higher SBPase activity, increased carbon dioxide fixation, reduced electrolyte leakage and increased carbohydrate accumulation relative to wild-type plants under the same chilling stress. It is also likely that transgenic plants would be more resilient to osmotic stress caused by drought or salinity, as the activation of SBPase is shown to be inhibited in chloroplasts exposed to hypertonic conditions, though this has not been directly tested. Overexpression of SBPase in transgenic tobacco plants resulted in enhanced photosynthetic efficiency and growth. Specifically, transgenic plants exhibited greater biomass and improved carbon dioxide fixation, as well as an increase in RuBisCO activity. The plants grew significantly faster and larger than wild-type plants, with increased sucrose and starch levels.
