= Transaldolase 1 =

Protein-coding gene in the species Homo sapiens

TALDO1

Identifiers
- Aliases: TALDO1, TAL, TAL-H, TALDOR, TALH, transaldolase 1
- External IDs: OMIM: 602063; MGI: 1274789; HomoloGene: 4916; GeneCards: TALDO1; OMA:TALDO1 - orthologs
Available structures
PDB	Ortholog search: PDBe RCSB
PDB	List of PDB id codes 1F05
Enzyme activity
EC #	BRENDA	ExPASy	KEGG	MetaCyc
2.2.1.2	↗	↗	↗	↗

Gene location (Human)
Chr.	Chromosome 11 (human)
Band	11p15.5	Start	747,415 bp
Band	11p15.5	End	765,012 bp

Gene location (Mouse)
Chr.	Chromosome 7 (mouse)
Band	7|7 F5	Start	140,972,112 bp
Band	7|7 F5	End	140,982,881 bp
RNA expression pattern
Bgee	Human / Mouse (ortholog); Top expressed in: trabecular bone; blood; gingival epithelium; oocyte; monocyte; bone marrow; oral cavity; palpebral conjunctiva; secondary oocyte; granulocyte / Top expressed in: granulocyte; lacrimal gland; blood; brown adipose tissue; endothelial cell of lymphatic vessel; conjunctival fornix; retinal pigment epithelium; tunica adventitia of aorta; fetal liver hematopoietic progenitor cell; parotid gland; More reference expression data
BioGPS	n/a
Gene ontology
Molecular function	transferase activity; transaldolase activity; catalytic activity; protein binding; monosaccharide binding; carbohydrate binding
Cellular component	cytoplasm; cytosol; extracellular exosome; intracellular membrane-bounded organelle; nucleus; nucleoplasm
Biological process	fructose 6-phosphate metabolic process; pentose-phosphate shunt; pentose-phosphate shunt, non-oxidative branch; xylulose biosynthetic process; glyceraldehyde-3-phosphate metabolic process; interleukin-12-mediated signaling pathway; carbohydrate metabolic process
Sources:Amigo / QuickGO
Orthologs
Species	Human	Mouse
Entrez	6888	21351
Ensembl	ENSG00000177156	ENSMUSG00000025503
UniProt	P37837	Q93092
RefSeq (mRNA)	NM_006755	NM_011528
RefSeq (protein)	NP_006746	NP_035658
Location (UCSC)	Chr 11: 0.75 – 0.77 Mb	Chr 7: 140.97 – 140.98 Mb
PubMed search
- Wikidata
View/Edit Human	View/Edit Mouse

Transaldolase 1 is a protein that in humans is encoded by the TALDO1 gene.

== Function ==
Transaldolase 1 is a key enzyme of the nonoxidative pentose phosphate pathway providing ribose-5-phosphate for nucleic acid synthesis and NADPH for lipid biosynthesis. This pathway can also maintain glutathione at a reduced state and thus protect sulfhydryl groups and cellular integrity from oxygen radicals. The functional gene of transaldolase 1 is located on chromosome 11 and a pseudogene is identified on chromosome 1 but there are conflicting map locations. The second and third exon of this gene were developed by insertion of a retrotransposable element. This gene is thought to be involved in multiple sclerosis. [provided by RefSeq, Jul 2008].

== See also ==
- Transaldolase — the type of enzyme of Transaldolase 1
