= Calvin cycle =

Light-independent reactions in photosynthesis

The internal structure of a chloroplast

The Calvin cycle, bio synthetic phase, dark reactions, or photosynthetic carbon reduction (PCR) cycle of photosynthesis is a series of chemical reactions that convert carbon dioxide and hydrogen-carrier compounds into glucose. The Calvin cycle is present in all photosynthetic eukaryotes and also many photosynthetic bacteria. In plants, these reactions occur in the stroma, the fluid-filled region of a chloroplast outside the thylakoid membranes. These reactions use the products (ATP and NADPH) of the light-dependent reactions and carry out further chemical processes on them. The Calvin cycle uses the chemical energy of ATP and the reducing power of NADPH from the light-dependent reactions to produce sugars for the plant to use. These substrates undergo a series of oxidoreduction (redox) reactions to produce sugars in a stepwise process; there is no direct reaction that converts several molecules of CO_{2} into a sugar. There are three phases to the light-independent reactions, collectively called the Calvin cycle: carboxylation, reduction reactions, and ribulose 1,5-bisphosphate (RuBP) regeneration.

Though it is also called the "dark reaction", the Calvin cycle does not occur in the dark or during nighttime. This is because the process requires NADPH, which is short-lived and comes from light-dependent reactions. In the dark, plants instead release sucrose into the phloem from their starch reserves to provide energy for the plant. The Calvin cycle thus happens when light is available independent of the kind of photosynthesis (C3 carbon fixation, C4 carbon fixation, and crassulacean acid metabolism (CAM)); CAM plants store malic acid in their vacuoles every night and release it by day to make this process work.

== Coupling to other metabolic pathways ==
The reactions of the Calvin cycle are closely coupled to the thylakoid electron transport chain, as the energy required to reduce the carbon dioxide is provided by NADPH produced during the light dependent reactions. The process of photorespiration, also known as the C2 cycle, is also coupled to the Calvin cycle because it results from an alternative reaction of the RuBisCO enzyme, and its final by-product is another glyceraldehyde-3-P molecule.

== Calvin cycle ==
Overview of the Calvin cycle and carbon fixation

The Calvin cycle, Calvin–Benson–Bassham (CBB) cycle, reductive pentose phosphate cycle (RPP cycle), or C3 cycle is a series of biochemical redox reactions that take place in the stroma of chloroplast in photosynthetic organisms. The cycle was discovered in 1950 by Melvin Calvin, James Bassham, and Andrew Benson at the University of California, Berkeley by using the radioactive isotope carbon-14.

Photosynthesis occurs in two stages in a cell. In the first stage, light-dependent reactions capture the energy of light and use it to make the energy-storage molecule ATP and the moderate-energy hydrogen carrier NADPH. The Calvin cycle uses these compounds to convert carbon dioxide and water into organic compounds that can be used by the organism (and by animals that feed on it). This set of reactions is also called carbon fixation. The key enzyme of the cycle is called RuBisCO. In the following biochemical equations, the chemical species (phosphates and carboxylic acids) exist in equilibrium among their various ionized states as governed by the pH.

The enzymes in the Calvin cycle are functionally equivalent to most enzymes used in other metabolic pathways such as gluconeogenesis and the pentose phosphate pathway, but the enzymes in the Calvin cycle are found in the chloroplast stroma instead of the cell cytosol, separating the reactions. They are activated in the light (which is why the name "dark reaction" is misleading), and also by products of the light-dependent reaction. These regulatory functions prevent the Calvin cycle from being respired to carbon dioxide. Energy (in the form of ATP) would be wasted in carrying out these reactions when they have no net productivity.

The sum of reactions in the Calvin cycle is the following:

3 CO_{2} + 6 NADPH + 9 ATP + 6 H^{+} → glyceraldehyde-3-phosphate (G3P) + 6 NADP^{+} + 9 ADP + 3 H_{2}O + 8 P_{i} (P_{i} = inorganic phosphate)

Hexose (six-carbon) sugars are not products of the Calvin cycle. Although many texts list a product of photosynthesis as C_{6}H_{12}O_{6}, this is mainly for convenience to match the equation of aerobic respiration, where six-carbon sugars are oxidized in mitochondria. The carbohydrate products of the Calvin cycle are three-carbon sugar phosphate molecules, or "triose phosphates", namely, glyceraldehyde-3-phosphate (G3P).

=== Steps ===
In the first stage of the Calvin cycle, a CO_{2} molecule is incorporated into one of two three-carbon molecules (glyceraldehyde 3-phosphate or G3P), where it uses up two molecules of ATP and two molecules of NADPH, which had been produced in the light-dependent stage. The three steps involved are:

Calvin cycle step 1 (black circles represent carbon atoms)

Calvin cycle steps 2 and 3 combined

1. The enzyme RuBisCO catalyses the carboxylation of ribulose-1,5-bisphosphate (RuBP) a 5-carbon compound, by carbon dioxide (a total of 6 carbons) in a two-step reaction. The product of the first step is enediol-enzyme complex that can capture CO_{2} or O_{2}. Thus, enediol-enzyme complex is the real carboxylase/oxygenase. The CO_{2} that is captured by enediol in second step produces an unstable six-carbon compound called 2-carboxy 3-keto 1,5-biphosphoribotol (CKABP) (or 3-keto-2-carboxyarabinitol 1,5-bisphosphate) that immediately splits into 2 molecules of 3-phosphoglycerate (also written as 3-phosphoglyceric acid, PGA, 3PGA, or 3-PGA), a 3-carbon compound.
2. The enzyme phosphoglycerate kinase catalyses the phosphorylation of 3-PGA by ATP (which was produced in the light-dependent stage). 1,3-Bisphosphoglycerate (glycerate-1,3-bisphosphate) and ADP are the products. (However, note that two 3-PGAs are produced for every CO_{2} that enters the cycle, so this step utilizes two ATP per CO_{2} fixed.)
3. The enzyme glyceraldehyde 3-phosphate dehydrogenase catalyses the reduction of 1,3BPGA by NADPH (which is another product of the light-dependent stage). Glyceraldehyde 3-phosphate (also called G3P, GP, TP, PGAL, GAP) is produced, and the NADPH itself is oxidized and becomes NADP^{+}. Again, two NADPH are utilized per CO_{2} fixed.

Regeneration stage of the Calvin cycle

The next stage in the Calvin cycle is to regenerate RuBP. Five G3P molecules produce three RuBP molecules, using up three molecules of ATP. Since each CO_{2} molecule produces two G3P molecules, three CO_{2} molecules produce six G3P molecules, of which five are used to regenerate RuBP, leaving a net gain of one G3P molecule per three CO_{2} molecules (as would be expected from the number of carbon atoms involved).

The regeneration stage of Calvin's cycle. Substances and their parts are outlined in colors: green - carbon accepting aldoses, pink - ketoses-donors of three-carbon groups, yellow - parts of ketoses remaining after donation of two-carbon keto-groups highlighted in orange. Enzymes are also highlighted: aldolases in purple and transketolases in red.

Simplified C3 cycle with structural formulas

The regeneration stage can be broken down into a series of steps.

1. Triose phosphate isomerase converts one of the G3P reversibly into dihydroxyacetone phosphate (DHAP), also a 3-carbon molecule.
2. Aldolase and fructose-1,6-bisphosphatase convert a G3P and a DHAP into fructose 6-phosphate (6C). A phosphate ion is lost into solution.
3. Then fixation of another CO_{2} generates two more G3P.
4. F6P has two carbons removed by transketolase, giving erythrose-4-phosphate (E4P). The two carbons on transketolase are added to a G3P, giving the ketose xylulose-5-phosphate (Xu5P).
5. E4P and a DHAP (formed from one of the G3P from the second CO_{2} fixation) are converted into sedoheptulose-1,7-bisphosphate (7C) by aldolase enzyme.
6. Sedoheptulose-1,7-bisphosphatase (one of only three enzymes of the Calvin cycle that are unique to plants) cleaves sedoheptulose-1,7-bisphosphate into sedoheptulose-7-phosphate, releasing an inorganic phosphate ion into solution.
7. Fixation of a third CO_{2} generates two more G3P. The ketose S7P has two carbons removed by transketolase, giving ribose-5-phosphate (R5P), and the two carbons remaining on transketolase are transferred to one of the G3P, giving another Xu5P. This leaves one G3P as the product of fixation of 3 CO_{2}, with generation of three pentoses that can be converted to Ru5P.
8. R5P is converted into ribulose-5-phosphate (Ru5P, RuP) by phosphopentose isomerase. Xu5P is converted into RuP by phosphopentose epimerase.
9. Finally, phosphoribulokinase (another plant-unique enzyme of the pathway) phosphorylates RuP into RuBP, ribulose-1,5-bisphosphate, completing the Calvin cycle. This requires the input of one ATP.

Thus, of six G3P produced, five are used to make three RuBP (5C) molecules (totaling 15 carbons), with only one G3P available for subsequent conversion to hexose. This requires nine ATP molecules and six NADPH molecules per three CO_{2} molecules. The equation of the overall Calvin cycle is shown diagrammatically below.

The overall equation of the Calvin cycle (black circles represent carbon atoms)

RuBisCO also reacts competitively with O_{2} instead of CO_{2} in photorespiration. The rate of photorespiration is higher at high temperatures. Photorespiration turns RuBP into 3-PGA and 2-phosphoglycolate, a 2-carbon molecule that can be converted via glycolate and glyoxylate to glycine. Via the glycine cleavage system and tetrahydrofolate, two glycines are converted into serine plus CO_{2}. Serine can be converted back to 3-phosphoglycerate. Thus, only 3 of 4 carbons from two phosphoglycolates can be converted back to 3-PGA. It can be seen that photorespiration has very negative consequences for the plant, because, rather than fixing CO_{2}, this process leads to loss of CO_{2}. C4 carbon fixation evolved to circumvent photorespiration, but can occur only in certain plants native to very warm or tropical climates—corn, for example. Furthermore, RuBisCOs catalyzing the light-independent reactions of photosynthesis generally exhibit an improved specificity for CO_{2} relative to O_{2}, in order to minimize the oxygenation reaction. This improved specificity evolved after RuBisCO incorporated a new protein subunit.

=== Products ===
The immediate products of one turn of the Calvin cycle are one glyceraldehyde-3-phosphate (G3P) molecule; 3 ADP and 2 NADP^{+} are also regenerated and later used again in the light-dependent reactions. Each G3P molecule is composed of 3 carbons. For the Calvin cycle to continue, RuBP (ribulose 1,5-bisphosphate) must be regenerated; 5 out of 6 carbons from the 2 G3P molecules are used for this purpose. Therefore, there is only 1 net carbon produced for each turn. To create one surplus G3P requires 3 carbons, and therefore 3 turns of the Calvin cycle. To make one glucose molecule (which can be created from 2 G3P molecules) would require 6 turns of the Calvin cycle. Surplus G3P can also be used to form other carbohydrates such as starch, sucrose, and cellulose, depending on what the plant needs.

== Light-dependent regulation ==
These reactions do not occur in the dark or at night. There is a light-dependent regulation of the cycle enzymes, as the third step requires NADPH.

There are two regulation systems at work when the cycle must be turned on or off: the thioredoxin/ferredoxin activation system, which activates some of the cycle enzymes; and the RuBisCo enzyme activation, active in the Calvin cycle, which involves its own activase.

The thioredoxin/ferredoxin system activates the enzymes glyceraldehyde-3-P dehydrogenase, glyceraldehyde-3-P phosphatase, fructose-1,6-bisphosphatase, sedoheptulose-1,7-bisphosphatase, and ribulose-5-phosphatase kinase, which are key points of the process. This happens when light is available, as the ferredoxin protein is reduced in the photosystem I complex of the thylakoid electron chain when electrons are circulating through it. Ferredoxin then binds to and reduces the thioredoxin protein, which activates the cycle enzymes by severing a cystine bond found in all these enzymes. This is a dynamic process as the same bond is formed again by other proteins that deactivate the enzymes. The implications of this process are that the enzymes remain mostly activated by day and are deactivated in the dark when there is no more reduced ferredoxin available.

The enzyme RuBisCo has its own, more complex activation process. It requires that a specific lysine amino acid be carbamylated to activate the enzyme. This lysine binds to RuBP and leads to a non-functional state if left uncarbamylated. A specific activase enzyme, called RuBisCo activase, helps this carbamylation process by removing one proton from the lysine and making the binding of the carbon dioxide molecule possible. Even then the RuBisCo enzyme is not yet functional, as it needs a magnesium ion bound to the lysine to function. This magnesium ion is released from the thylakoid lumen when the inner pH drops due to the active pumping of protons from the electron flow. RuBisCo activase itself is activated by increased concentrations of ATP in the stroma caused by its phosphorylation.

== See also ==
- Wood–Ljungdahl pathway – Set of biochemical reactions used by some bacteria
