= Transketolase =

Enzyme involved in metabolic pathways

transketolase

Identifiers
- EC no.: 2.2.1.1
- CAS no.: 9014-48-6

Databases
- IntEnz: IntEnz view
- BRENDA: BRENDA entry
- ExPASy: NiceZyme view
- KEGG: KEGG entry
- MetaCyc: metabolic pathway
- PRIAM: profile
- PDB structures: RCSB PDB PDBe PDBsum
- Gene Ontology: AmiGO / QuickGO
Search
- PMC: articles
- PubMed: articles
- NCBI: proteins

transketolase

Identifiers
- Symbol: TKT
- NCBI gene: 7086
- HGNC: 11834
- OMIM: 606781
- RefSeq: NM_001064
- UniProt: P29401

Other data
- EC number: 2.2.1.1
- Locus: Chr. 3 p14.3
Search for
- Structures: Swiss-model
- Domains: InterPro

Transketolase (abbreviated as TK) is an enzyme that, in humans, is encoded by the TKT gene. It participates in both the pentose phosphate pathway in all organisms and the Calvin cycle of photosynthesis. Transketolase catalyzes two important reactions, which operate in opposite directions in these two pathways. In the first reaction of the non-oxidative pentose phosphate pathway, the cofactor thiamine diphosphate accepts a 2-carbon fragment from a 5-carbon ketose (D-xylulose-5-P), then transfers this fragment to a 5-carbon aldose (D-ribose-5-P) to form a 7-carbon ketose (sedoheptulose-7-P). The abstraction of two carbons from D-xylulose-5-P yields the 3-carbon aldose glyceraldehyde-3-P. In the Calvin cycle, transketolase catalyzes the reverse reaction, the conversion of sedoheptulose-7-P and glyceraldehyde-3-P to pentoses, the aldose D-ribose-5-P and the ketose D-xylulose-5-P.

The second reaction catalyzed by transketolase in the pentose phosphate pathway involves the same thiamine diphosphate-mediated transfer of a 2-carbon fragment from D-xylulose-5-P to the aldose erythrose-4-phosphate, affording fructose 6-phosphate and glyceraldehyde-3-P. Again, the same reaction occurs in the Calvin cycle but in the opposite direction. Moreover, in the Calvin cycle, this is the first reaction catalyzed by transketolase rather than the second.

Transketolase connects the pentose phosphate pathway to glycolysis, feeding excess sugar phosphates into the main carbohydrate metabolic pathways in mammals. Its presence is necessary for the production of NADPH, especially in tissues actively engaged in biosyntheses, such as fatty acid synthesis by the liver and mammary glands, and for steroid synthesis by the liver and adrenal glands. Thiamine diphosphate is an essential cofactor, along with calcium.

Transketolase is abundantly expressed in the mammalian cornea by the stromal keratocytes and epithelial cells and is reputed to be one of the corneal crystallins.

== Species distribution ==
Transketolase is widely expressed in many organisms, including bacteria, plants, and mammals. The following human genes encode proteins with transketolase activity:

- TKT (transketolase)
- TKTL1 (transketolase-like protein 1)
- TKTL2 (transketolase-like protein 2)

== Structure ==
The entrance to the active site for this enzyme is made up mainly of several arginine, histidine, serine, and aspartate side-chains, with a glutamate side-chain playing a secondary role. These side-chains, specifically Arg359, Arg528, His469, and Ser386, are conserved within each transketolase enzyme and interact with the phosphate group of the donor and acceptor substrates. Because the substrate channel is so narrow, the donor and acceptor substrates cannot be bound simultaneously. Also, the substrates conform into a slightly extended form upon binding in the active site to accommodate this narrow channel.

Although this enzyme can bind numerous types of substrates, such as phosphorylated and nonphosphorylated monosaccharides including the keto and aldosugars fructose, ribose, etc., it has a high specificity for the stereoconfiguration of the hydroxyl groups of the sugars. These hydroxyl groups at C-3 and C-4 of the ketose donor must be in the D-threo configuration to correctly correspond to the C-1 and C-2 positions on the aldose acceptor. Also, they stabilize the substrate in the active site by interacting with the Asp477, His30, and His263 residues. Disruption of this configuration, both the placement of hydroxyl groups or their stereochemistry, would consequently alter the H-bonding between the residues and substrates thus causing a lower affinity for the substrates.

In the first half of this pathway, His263 is used to effectively abstract the C3 hydroxyl proton, which thus allows a 2-carbon segment to be cleaved from fructose 6-phosphate. The cofactor necessary for this step to occur is thiamin pyrophosphate (TPP). The binding of TPP to the enzyme incurs no major conformational change to the enzyme; instead, the enzyme has two flexible loops at the active site that make TPP accessible and binding possible. Thus, this allows the active site to have a "closed" conformation rather than a large conformational change. Later in the pathway, His263 is used as a proton donor for the substrate acceptor-TPP complex, which can then generate erythrose-4-phosphate.

The histidine and aspartate side-chains are used to effectively stabilize the substrate within the active site and participate in deprotonation of the substrate. To be specific, the His 263 and His30 side-chains form hydrogen bonds to the aldehyde end of the substrate, which is deepest into the substrate channel, and Asp477 forms hydrogen bonds with the alpha hydroxyl group on the substrate, where it works to effectively bind the substrate and check for proper stereochemistry. It is also thought that Asp477 could have important catalytic effects because of its orientation in the middle of the active site and its interactions with the alpha hydroxyl group of the substrate. Glu418, located in the deepest region of the active site, plays a critical role in stabilizing the TPP cofactor. Specifically, it is involved in the cofactor-assisted proton abstraction from the substrate molecule.

The phosphate group of the substrate also plays an important role in stabilizing the substrate upon its entrance into the active site. The tight ionic and polar interactions between this phosphate group and the residues Arg359, Arg528, His469, and Ser386 collectively work to stabilize the substrate by forming H-bonds to the oxygen atoms of the phosphate. The ionic nature is found in the salt bridge formed from Arg359 to the phosphate group.

== Mechanism ==
The catalysis of this mechanism is initiated by the deprotonation of TPP at the thiazolium ring. This carbanion then binds to the carbonyl of the donor substrate, thus cleaving the bond between C-2 and C-3. This keto fragment remains covalently bound to the C-2 carbon of TPP. The donor substrate is then released, and the acceptor substrate enters the active site where the fragment, bound to the intermediate α-β-dihydroxyethyl thiamin diphosphate, is transferred to the acceptor.

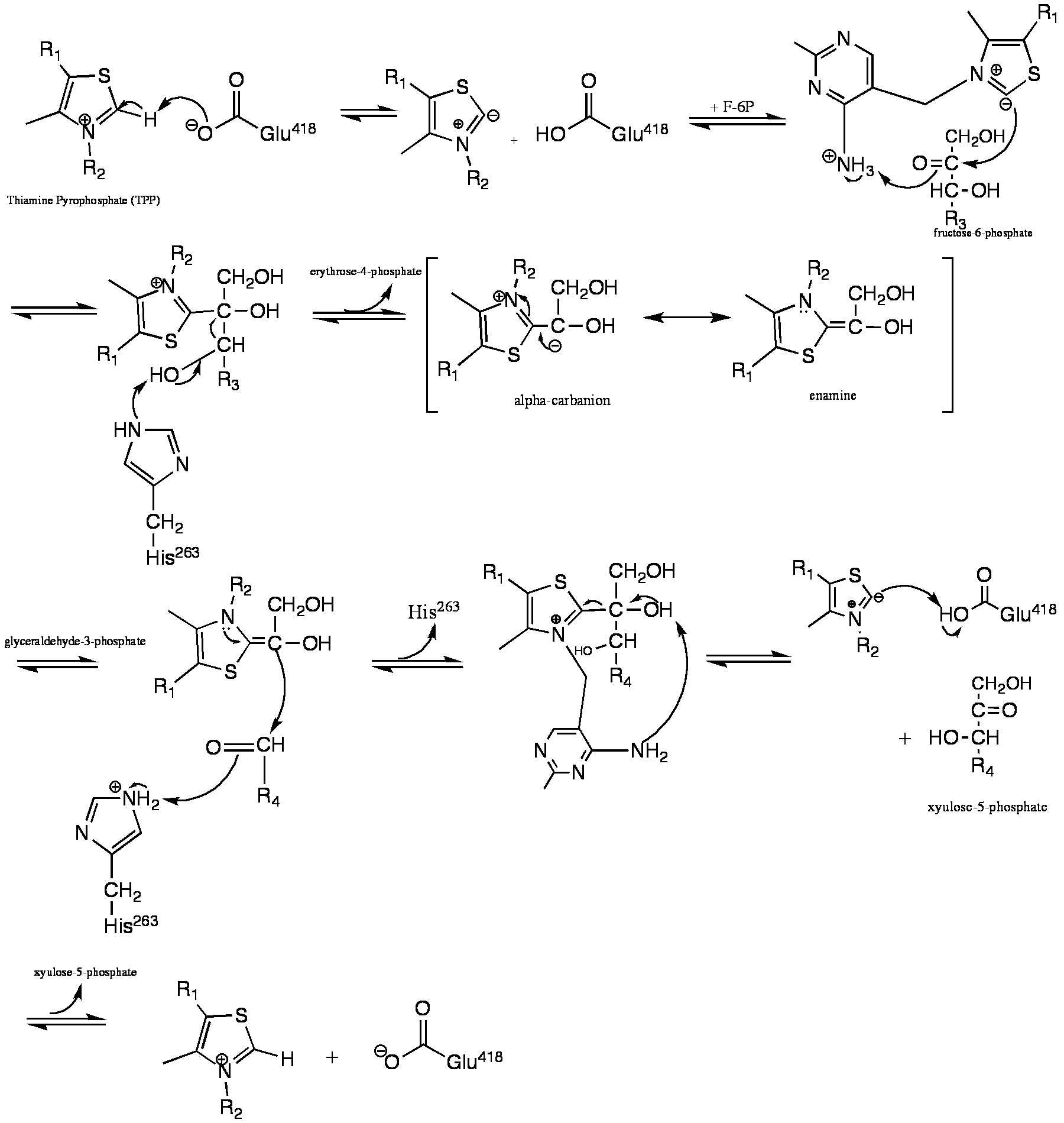
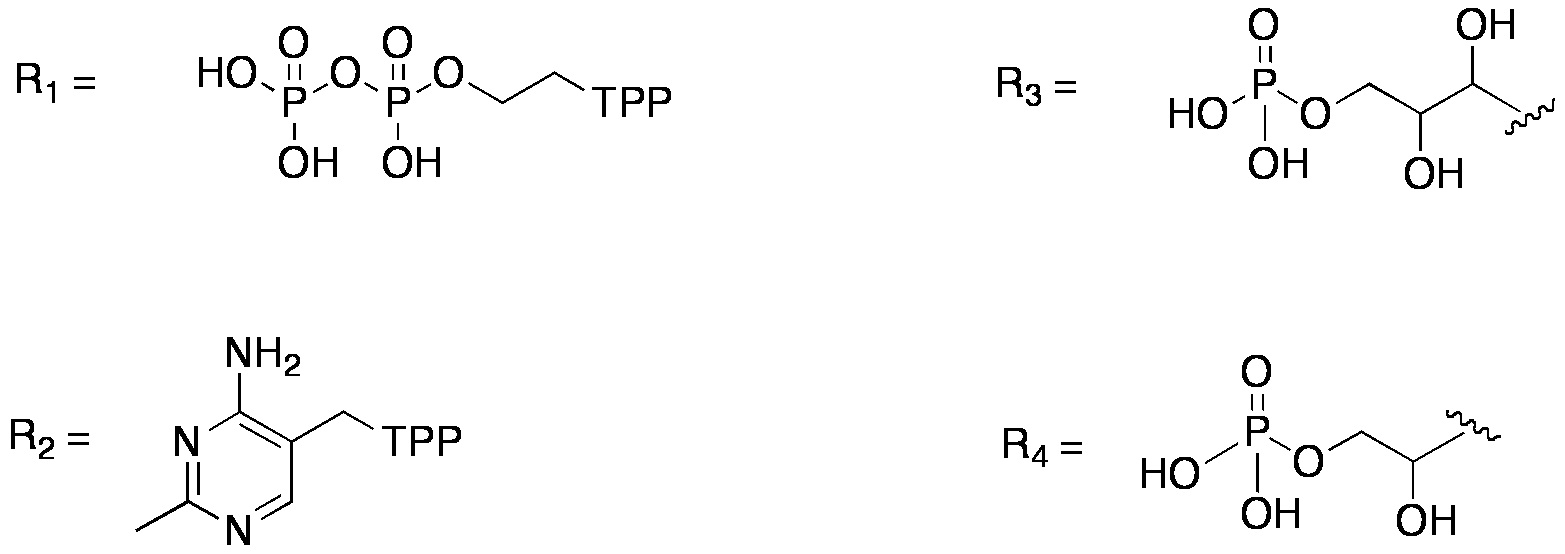

Experiments have also been conducted that test the effect of replacing alanine for the amino acids at the entrance to the active site, Arg359, Arg528, and His469, which interact with the phosphate group of the substrate. This replacement creates a mutant enzyme with impaired catalytic activity.

== Role in disease ==
Transketolase activity decreases due to thiamine deficiency, generally due to malnutrition. Several diseases are associated with thiamine deficiency, including beriberi, biotin-thiamine-responsive basal ganglia disease (BTBGD), Wernicke–Korsakoff syndrome, and others (see thiamine for a comprehensive listing).

In Wernicke–Korsakoff syndrome, while no mutations could be demonstrated, there is an indication that thiamine deficiency leads to Wernicke–Korsakoff syndrome only in those whose transketolase has a reduced affinity for thiamine. In this way, the activity of transketolase is greatly hindered, and, as a consequence, the entire pentose phosphate pathway is inhibited.

In Transketolase Deficiency, also known as SDDHD (Short Stature, Developmental Delay, and congenital Heart Defects), the disease is caused by an inherited autosomal recessive mutation in the TKT gene. A rare disorder of pentose phosphate metabolism with symptoms apparent in infancy including developmental delay and intellectual disability, delayed or absent speech, short stature, and congenital heart defects. Additional reported features include hypotonia, hyperactivity, stereotypic behavior, ophthalmologic abnormalities, hearing impairment, and variable facial dysmorphism, among others. Laboratory analysis shows elevated plasma and urinary polyols (erythritol, arabitol, and ribitol) and urinary sugar-phosphates (ribose-5-phosphate and xylulose/ribulose-5-phosphate). "Cell extracts from all 5 patients showed absent or low residual TKT activity. Boyle et al. (2016) suggested that the low TKT activity in some tissues, possibly from another protein with the same function, might explain why TKT deficiency is compatible with life even though TKT is an essential enzyme."

== Diagnostic use ==
Red blood cell transketolase (a.k.a. ETK for erythrocyte transketolase) activity is reduced in deficiency of thiamine (vitamin B_{1}), and may be used in the diagnosis of Wernicke encephalopathy and other B_{1}-deficiency syndromes if the diagnosis is in doubt. Apart from the baseline enzyme activity (which may be normal even in deficiency states), acceleration of enzyme activity after the addition of thiamine pyrophosphate may be diagnostic of thiamine deficiency (0-15% normal, 15-25% deficiency, >25% severe deficiency).
