= Monosaccharide-transporting ATPase =

Class of enzymes

monosaccharide-transporting ATPase

Identifiers
- EC no.: 3.6.3.17

Databases
- IntEnz: IntEnz view
- BRENDA: BRENDA entry
- ExPASy: NiceZyme view
- KEGG: KEGG entry
- MetaCyc: metabolic pathway
- PRIAM: profile
- PDB structures: RCSB PDB PDBe PDBsum
- Gene Ontology: AmiGO / QuickGO
Search
- PMC: articles
- PubMed: articles
- NCBI: proteins

In enzymology, a monosaccharide-transporting ATPase (EC 3.6.3.17) is an enzyme that catalyzes the chemical reaction

ATP + H_{2}O + monosaccharideout $\rightleftharpoons$ ADP + phosphate + monosaccharidein

The 3 substrates of this enzyme are ATP, H_{2}O, and monosaccharide, whereas its 3 products are ADP, phosphate, and monosaccharide.

This enzyme belongs to the family of hydrolases, specifically those acting on acid anhydrides to catalyse transmembrane movement of substances. The systematic name of this enzyme class is ATP phosphohydrolase (monosaccharide-importing). This enzyme participates in abc transporters - general.

== Structural studies ==
As of late 2007, only one structure has been solved for this class of enzymes, with the PDB accession code 2GX6.
