= Erythrulose =

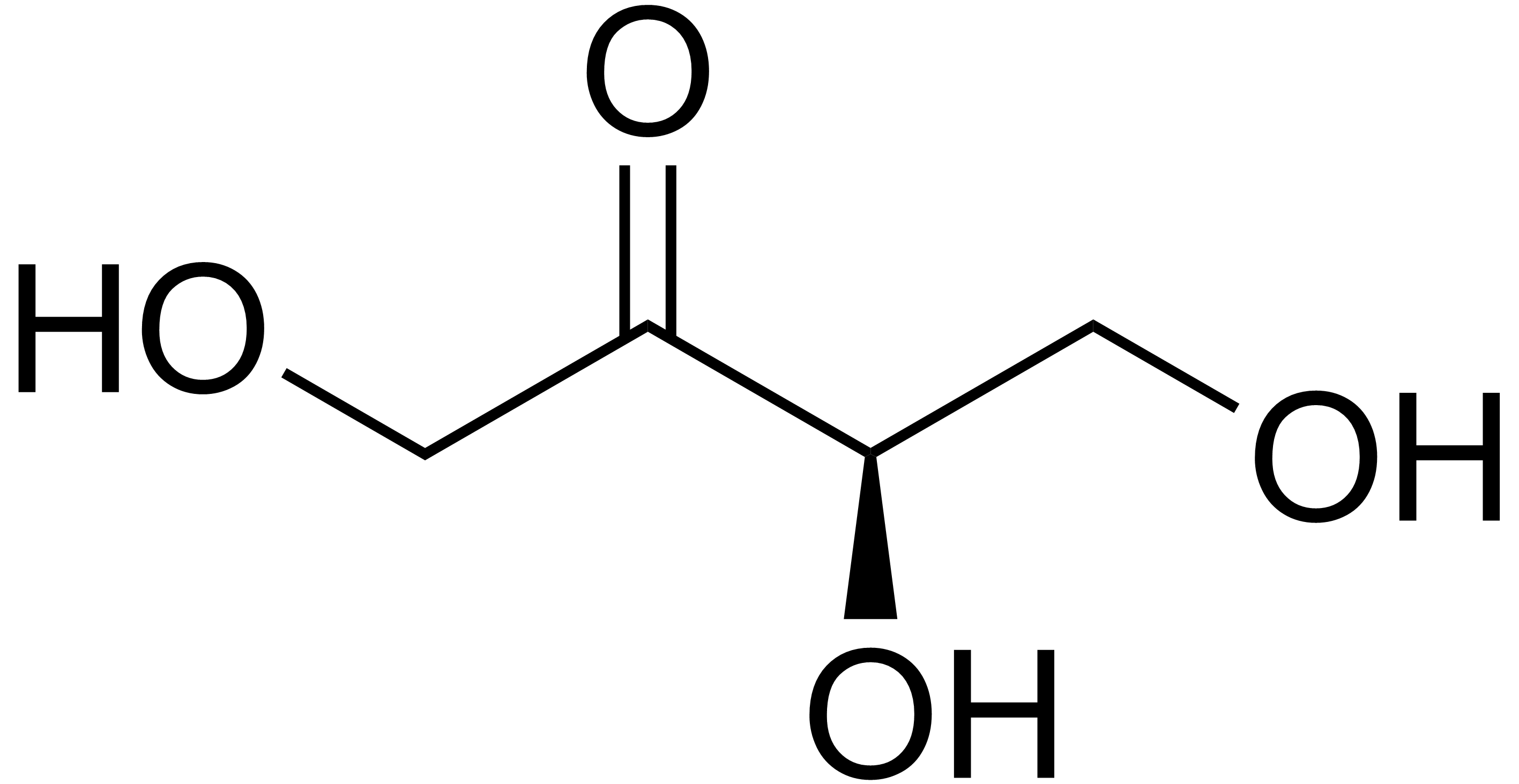
- D-Erythrulose

- Erythrulose enantiomers in Fischer projection

Names
- IUPAC name D-glycero-Tetrulose
- Systematic IUPAC name (3R)-1,3,4-Trihydroxybutan-2-one
- Other names Glycerotetrulose, erythrulose

Identifiers
CAS Number	496-55-9
3D model (JSmol)	Interactive image; Interactive image
ChEBI	CHEBI:16023
ChemSpider	4573812
ECHA InfoCard	100.129.795
PubChem CID	5460177
UNII	09058VOU0Z
CompTox Dashboard (EPA)	DTXSID70862137
- InChI: InChI=1S/C4H8O4/c5-1-3(7)4(8)2-6/h3,5-7H,1-2H2/t3-/m1/s1 Key: UQPHVQVXLPRNCX-GSVOUGTGSA-N; InChI=1/C4H8O4/c5-1-3(7)4(8)2-6/h3,5-7H,1-2H2/t3-/m1/s1 Key: UQPHVQVXLPRNCX-GSVOUGTGBU
- SMILES: OCC([C@H](O)CO)=O; O=C(CO)[C@H](O)CO

Properties
Chemical formula	C_{4}H_{8}O_{4}
Molar mass	120.104 g·mol^{−1}
Appearance	Syrup
Solubility in water	Soluble
- Except where otherwise noted, data are given for materials in their standard state (at 25 °C [77 °F], 100 kPa). verify (what is ?) Infobox references

D-Erythrulose (also known as erythrulose) is the organic compound with the formula HOCH_{2}C(O)CH(OH)CH_{2}OH (alternative notation as C_{4}H_{8}O_{4}). As a ketone-containing monosaccharide, it is classified as a ketose and tetrose.

Erythrulose is a colorless, sweet-tasting, water-soluble solid. Among the sugars, it is relatively obscure, being described as a "novelty tetrose".

In 2026, broadband spectral surveys using large Earth-based telescopes detected erythrulose on dust grains in molecular clouds near the center of the Milky Way.

== Synthesis ==
Erythrulose can be synthesized by enzyme-mediated condensation of glycolaldehyde:

2 HOCH_{2}CHO → HOCH_{2}C(O)CH(OH)CH_{2}OH

Multiple pathways lead to erythrulose phosphates from glucose as well as splitting of sedoheptulose.

Its detection in the Milky Way molecular cloud indicates that erythrulose may be synthesized abiotically in the extreme environment of space.

== Occurrence ==
Erythrulose occurs in many fruits, including melons and red raspberries.

Among some 340 circumstellar molecules discovered in dust and gases of the interstellar medium, erythrulose is the first sugar identified. The discovery was made from radio telescope surveys of G+0.693−0.027, a molecular cloud near the center of the Milky Way. Two radio telescopes in Spain were used: the 40 metre telescope at Yebes and the 30 metre telescope in Granada.

Identification of erythrulose in interstellar dust of the Milky Way indicates, if not abiotic synthesis, its possible involvement in forming sugar-containing nucleic acids during the origin of life on Earth about four billion years ago.
