= TKTL2 =

Protein-coding gene in the species Homo sapiens

Identifiers
- Aliases: TKTL2, transketolase like 2
- External IDs: MGI: 1921669; HomoloGene: 69456; GeneCards: TKTL2; OMA:TKTL2 - orthologs

Gene location (Human)
Chr.	Chromosome 4 (human)
Band	4q32.2	Start	163,471,095 bp
Band	4q32.2	End	163,473,754 bp

Gene location (Mouse)
Chr.	Chromosome 8 (mouse)
Band	8|8 B3.1	Start	66,964,408 bp
Band	8|8 B3.1	End	66,970,987 bp
RNA expression pattern
Bgee	Human / Mouse (ortholog); Top expressed in: sperm; left testis; right testis; gonad; monocyte; lymph node; human musculoskeletal system; connective tissue; adipose tissue; muscular system / Top expressed in: spermatocyte; spermatid; secondary oocyte; zygote; seminiferous tubule; primary oocyte; blastocyst; yolk sac; More reference expression data
BioGPS	n/a
Gene ontology
Molecular function	transferase activity; catalytic activity; metal ion binding; transketolase activity
Cellular component	cytoplasm
Biological process	metabolism
Sources:Amigo / QuickGO
Orthologs
Species	Human	Mouse
Entrez	84076	74419
Ensembl	ENSG00000151005	ENSMUSG00000025519
UniProt	Q9H0I9	Q9D4D4
RefSeq (mRNA)	NM_032136	NM_001271574; NM_028927
RefSeq (protein)	NP_115512	NP_001258503; NP_083203
Location (UCSC)	Chr 4: 163.47 – 163.47 Mb	Chr 8: 66.96 – 66.97 Mb
PubMed search
- Wikidata
View/Edit Human	View/Edit Mouse

Transketolase-like protein 2 is an enzyme that in humans is encoded by the TKTL2 gene.
