= RPE (gene) =

Protein-coding gene in the species Homo sapiens

Available structures
| PDB | Ortholog search: PDBe RCSB |
| PDB | List of PDB id codes 3OVQ, 3OVR, 3OVP, 3QC3 |

Identifiers
- Aliases: RPE, RPE2-1, ribulose-5-phosphate-3-epimerase
- External IDs: OMIM: 180480; MGI: 1913896; HomoloGene: 12005; GeneCards: RPE; OMA:RPE - orthologs

Gene location (Human)
| Chr. | Chromosome 2 (human) |
| Band | 2q34 | Start | 210,002,565 bp |
| Band | 2q34 | End | 210,022,260 bp |

Gene location (Mouse)
| Chr. | Chromosome 1 (mouse) |
| Band | 1|1 C3 | Start | 66,739,990 bp |
| Band | 1|1 C3 | End | 66,758,964 bp |
RNA expression pattern
| Bgee | Human / Mouse (ortholog); Top expressed in: islet of Langerhans; Achilles tendon; epithelium of colon; rectum; bone marrow cells; Brodmann area 23; endothelial cell; ventricular zone; stromal cell of endometrium; right adrenal cortex / Top expressed in: saccule; seminal vesicula; brown adipose tissue; granulocyte; intercostal muscle; gastric mucosa; otic placode; mucous cell of stomach; secondary oocyte; duodenum; More reference expression data |
| BioGPS | n/a |
Gene ontology
| Molecular function | racemase and epimerase activity, acting on carbohydrates and derivatives; ribulose-phosphate 3-epimerase activity; catalytic activity; isomerase activity; protein homodimerization activity; metal ion binding; identical protein binding |
| Cellular component | cytosol; extracellular exosome |
| Biological process | pentose catabolic process; pentose-phosphate shunt; metabolism; pentose-phosphate shunt, non-oxidative branch; cellular carbohydrate metabolic process; carbohydrate metabolic process |
Sources:Amigo / QuickGO
Orthologs
| Species | Human | Mouse |
| Entrez | 6120 | 66646 |
| Ensembl | ENSG00000197713 | ENSMUSG00000026005 |
| UniProt | Q96AT9 | Q8VEE0 |
| RefSeq (mRNA) | NM_001278282; NM_001278283; NM_001278285; NM_001278286; NM_001278288 NM_001278289; NM_006916; NM_199229; NM_001318926; NM_001318927; NM_001318928; NM_001318929; NM_001318930; NM_001318931 | NM_025683; NM_001310642; NM_001310643; NM_001310644 |
| RefSeq (protein) | NP_001265211; NP_001265212; NP_001265214; NP_001265215; NP_001265217 NP_001265218; NP_001305855; NP_001305856; NP_001305857; NP_001305858; NP_001305859; NP_001305860; NP_008847; NP_954699 | NP_001297571; NP_001297572; NP_001297573; NP_079959 |
| Location (UCSC) | Chr 2: 210 – 210.02 Mb | Chr 1: 66.74 – 66.76 Mb |
| PubMed search |
- Wikidata
| View/Edit Human | View/Edit Mouse |

Ribulose-phosphate 3-epimerase is an enzyme that in humans is encoded by the RPE gene.
