= Heptose =

Class of carbohydrate

A heptose is a monosaccharide with seven carbon atoms.

They have either an aldehyde functional group in position 1 (aldoheptoses) or a ketone functional group in position 2, 3 or 4 (ketoheptoses). Ketoheptoses have 4 chiral centers, whereas aldoheptoses have 5.

== Examples ==
There are few examples of seven-carbon sugars in nature, among which are:

- sedoheptulose or D-altro-heptulose (a ketose), an intermediate in the Calvin cycle and in lipid A biosynthesis
- mannoheptulose (a ketose), found in avocadoes
- L-glycero-D-manno-heptose (an aldose), a late intermediate in lipid A biosynthesis.

== Structural role ==
The production of heptose is conserved across gram-negative bacteria. In the form of L-glycero-D-mannose-heptose, heptose is a key component in the secondary membrane of gram-negative bacteria. Gram-negative bacteria, in addition to having a cell wall, are also encapsulated by a membrane composed of lipopolysaccharides. These lipopolysaccharides comprise an endotoxin that acts as an immune system agonist and elicits strong responses. This toxin, known as lipid A, consists of a core of one to three heptose molecules. The 7-carbon heptose molecules are essential for stability in the lipopolysaccharide membrane, forming an interconnected network utilizing divalent cations.

== Role in cell signaling ==
Heptose, in the form of heptose 1-7-bisphosphate, has been found to be one of the components responsible for the pathogenic nature of gram negative bacteria. In the bacterium biosynthesis pathway, heptose is phosphorylated to heptose 1-7-bisphosphate. In addition, like other sugars, heptose may exist in either the alpha anomer or the beta anomer. Before synthetic production of heptose-bisphosphate (HBP) for studies, cytosolic HBP was thought to influence NF-kB, a transcription factor in mammalian cells. Along with producing the first synthetic version of HBP, it was shown that the beta form of the heptose acts as a pathogen-associated molecular pattern (PAMP) and activates the NF-kB signaling pathway. A PAMP is a specific structure, component, or molecule that triggers the immune response after recognition by pattern recognition receptors on mammalian cells.
