= Threose =

- Haworth projection of alpha-D-threofuranose

- d-Threose

- l-Threose

Names
- IUPAC names d-Threose l-Threose
- Systematic IUPAC name (2S,3R)-2,3,4-Trihydroxybutanal (d) (2R,3S)-2,3,4-Trihydroxybutanal (l)
- Other names Threotetrose

Identifiers
CAS Number	95-43-2 (d); 95-44-3 (l)
3D model (JSmol)	(d): Interactive image; (l): Interactive image
ChEBI	CHEBI:28587
ChemSpider	388736
ECHA InfoCard	100.002.199
PubChem CID	439665 (d)
UNII	4EHO9A06LX (d); MHH79K1BVR (l)
CompTox Dashboard (EPA)	DTXSID101017421
- InChI: InChI=1S/C4H8O4/c5-1-3(7)4(8)2-6/h1,3-4,6-8H,2H2/t3-,4-/m1/s1 Key: YTBSYETUWUMLBZ-QWWZWVQMSA-N; InChI=1/C4H8O4/c5-1-3(7)4(8)2-6/h1,3-4,6-8H,2H2/t3-,4-/m1/s1 Key: YTBSYETUWUMLBZ-QWWZWVQMBY
- SMILES: (d): O=C[C@@H](O)[C@H](O)CO; (l): OC[C@H](O)[C@@H](O)C=O

Properties
Chemical formula	C_{4}H_{8}O_{4}
Molar mass	120.104 g·mol^{−1}
Appearance	Syrup
Solubility in water	Very soluble
- Except where otherwise noted, data are given for materials in their standard state (at 25 °C [77 °F], 100 kPa). verify (what is ?) Infobox references

Threose is a four-carbon monosaccharide with molecular formula C_{4}H_{8}O_{4}. It has a terminal aldehyde group, rather than a ketone, in its linear chain and so is considered part of the aldose family of monosaccharides. The threose name can be used to refer to both the d- and l-stereoisomers and more generally to the racemic mixture (d/L-, equal parts D- and L-) as well as to the more generic threose structure (absolute stereochemistry unspecified).

The prefix "threo-" which derives from threose (and "erythro-" from a corresponding diastereomer erythrose) offer a useful way to describe general organic structures with adjacent chiral centers, where "the prefixes... designate the relative configuration of the centers". As is depicted in a Fischer projection of d-threose, the adjacent substituents will have a syn orientation in the isomer referred to as "threo", and are anti in the isomer referred to as "erythro".

Fischer projections depicting the two enantiomers of threose

Although often inconsequential, threose in aqueous solution mainly exists as the hydrate owing to the following equilibrium:

HOCH_{2}CH(OH)CH(OH)CHO + H_{2}O ⇌ HOCH_{2}CH(OH)CH(OH)CH(OH)_{2}

== See also ==
- Threitol
- Threonic acid
- Threose nucleic acid
