= Transaldolase =

Enzyme family

Identifiers
- EC no.: 2.2.1.2
- CAS no.: 9014-46-4

Databases
- BRENDA: enzyme data
- ExPASy: NiceZyme view
- KEGG: enzyme entry
- MetaCyc: metabolic pathway
- Rhea: reactions
- PDB structures: RCSB PDB PDBe PDBsum
- Gene Ontology: AmiGO / QuickGO
Search
- PMC: articles
- PubMed: articles
- NCBI: proteins

Transaldolase
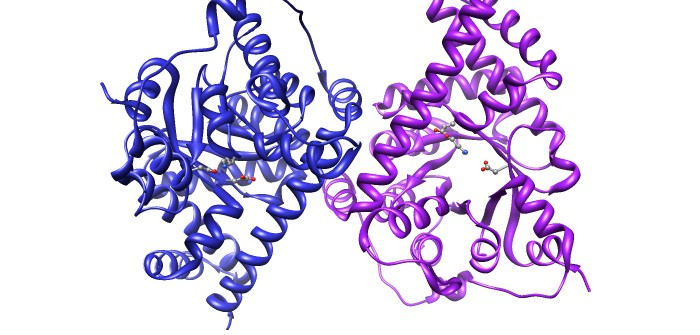
- Crystallographic structure of human transaldolase.

Identifiers
- Symbol: Transaldolase
- Pfam: PF00923
- InterPro: IPR001585
- PROSITE: PDOC00741
- SCOP2: 1ucw / SCOPe / SUPFAM
Available protein structures:
- PDB: 1f05, 1i2n, 1i2o, 1i2p, 1i2q, 1i2r, 1l6w, 1onr, 1ucw,1vpx, 2cwn IPR001585 PF00923 (ECOD; PDBsum)
- AlphaFold: IPR001585; PF00923

transaldolase 1

Identifiers
- Symbol: TALDO1
- NCBI gene: 6888
- HGNC: 11559
- OMIM: 602063
- RefSeq: NM_006755
- UniProt: P37837

Other data
- EC number: 2.2.1.2
- Locus: Chr. 11 p15.5-15.4
Search for
- Structures: Swiss-model
- Domains: InterPro

transaldolase B

Identifiers
- Symbol: talB
- NCBI gene: 4199095
- PDB: 1onr
- RefSeq: NC_008245.1
- UniProt: P0A870

Other data
- EC number: 2.2.1.2
Search for
- Structures: Swiss-model
- Domains: InterPro

Transaldolase is an enzyme (EC 2.2.1.2) of the non-oxidative phase of the pentose phosphate pathway. In humans, transaldolase is encoded by the TALDO1 gene.

The following chemical reaction is catalyzed by transaldolase:

sedoheptulose 7-phosphate
+
glyceraldehyde 3-phosphate
erythrose 4-phosphate
+
fructose 6-phosphate

== Clinical significance ==
The pentose phosphate pathway has two metabolic functions: (1) generation of nicotinamide adenine dinucleotide phosphate (reduced NADPH), for reductive biosynthesis, and (2) formation of ribose, which is an essential component of ATP, DNA, and RNA. Transaldolase links the pentose phosphate pathway to glycolysis. In patients with deficiency of transaldolase, there's an accumulation of erythritol (from erythrose 4-phosphate), D-arabitol, and ribitol.

The deletion in 3 base pairs in the TALDO1 gene results in the absence of serine at position 171 of the transaldolase protein, which is part of a highly conserved region, suggesting that the mutation causes the transaldolase deficiency that is found in erythrocytes and lymphoblasts. The deletion of this amino acid can lead to liver cirrhosis and hepatosplenomegaly (enlarged spleen and liver) during early infancy. Transaldolase is also a target of autoimmunity in patients with multiple sclerosis.

== Structure ==
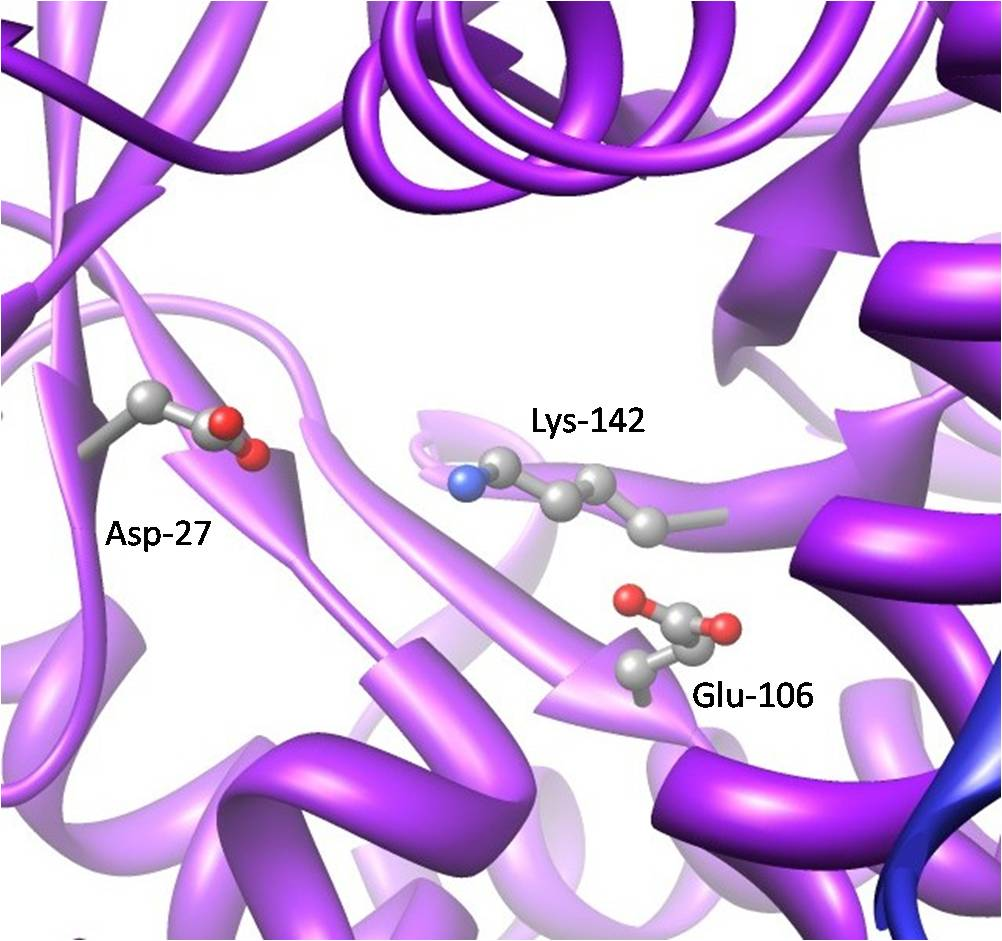
Active site of the transaldolase enzyme highlighting the key amino acid residues (Asp-27, Glu-106, and Lys-142) involved in catalysis.

Transaldolase is a single domain composed of 337 amino acids. The core structure is an α/β barrel, similar to other class I aldolases, made up of eight parallel β-sheets and seven α-helices. There are also seven additional α-helices that are not part of the barrel. Hydrophobic amino acids are located between the β-sheets in the barrel and the surrounding α-helices to contribute to packing, such as the area containing Leu-168, Phe-170, Phe-189, Gly-311, and Phe-315. In the crystal, human transaldolase forms a dimer, with the two subunits connected by 18 residues in each subunit. See mechanism to the left for details.

The active site, located in the center of the barrel, contains three key residues: lysine-142, glutamate-106, and aspartate-27. The lysine holds the sugar in place while the glutamate and aspartate act as proton donors and acceptors.

== Mechanism of catalysis ==
The residue of lysine-142 in the active site of transaldolase forms a Schiff base with the keto group in sedoheptulose-7-phosphate after deprotonation by another active site residue, glutamate-106. The reaction mechanism is similar to the reverse reaction catalyzed by aldolase: The bond joining carbons 3 and 4 is broken, leaving dihydroxyacetone joined to the enzyme via a Schiff base. This cleavage reaction generates the unusual aldose sugar erythrose-4-phosphate. Then transaldolase catalyzes the condensation of glyceraldehyde-3-phosphate with the Schiff base of dihydroxyacetone, yielding enzyme-bound fructose 6-phosphate. Hydrolysis of the Schiff base liberates free fructose 6-phosphate, one of the products of the pentose phosphate pathway.

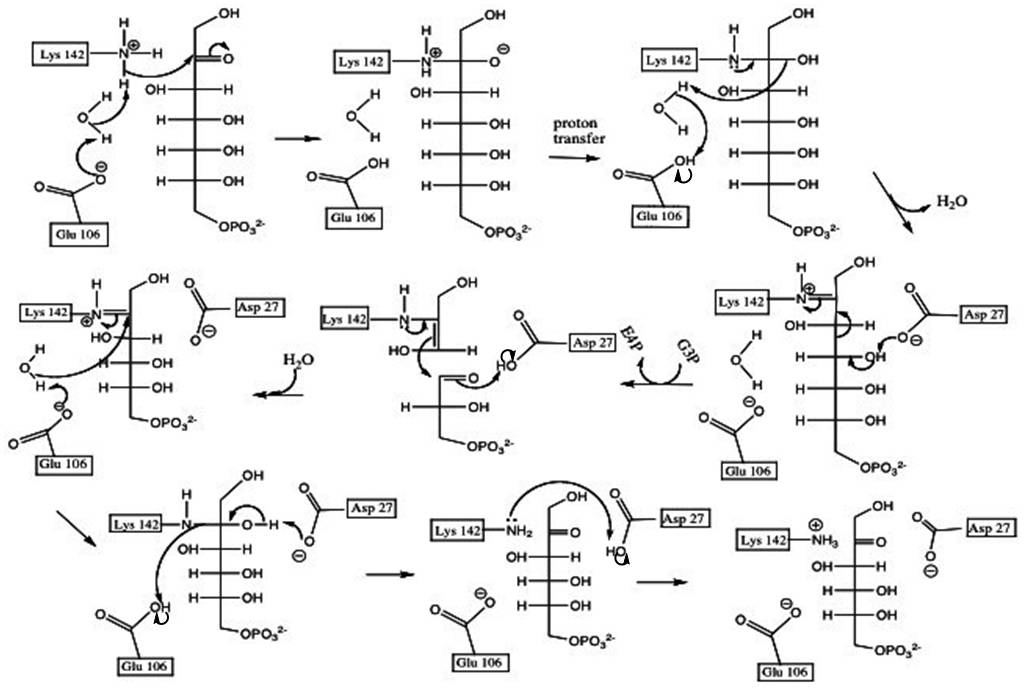
Reaction scheme for the conversion of sedoheptulose-7-phosphate to fructose-6-phosphate.

The pentose phosphate pathway adapted from (Verhoeven, 2001)

== See also ==
- Transaldolase deficiency
