= Sedoheptulose =

Names
- IUPAC name D-altro-Hept-2-ulose
- Systematic IUPAC name (3S,4R,5R,6R)-1,3,4,5,6,7-Hexahydroxyheptan-2-one
- Other names D-altro-2-Heptulose; D-altro-Heptulose

Identifiers
CAS Number	3019-74-7
3D model (JSmol)	Interactive image
ChEBI	CHEBI:16802
ChemSpider	4573620
ECHA InfoCard	100.019.243
MeSH	Sedoheptulose
PubChem CID	5459879
UNII	40A0W1XJ6X
CompTox Dashboard (EPA)	DTXSID10952581
- InChI: InChI=1S/C7H14O7/c8-1-3(10)5(12)7(14)6(13)4(11)2-9/h3,5-10,12-14H,1-2H2/t3-,5-,6-,7-/m1/s1 Key: HSNZZMHEPUFJNZ-SHUUEZRQSA-N; InChI=1/C7H14O7/c8-1-3(10)5(12)7(14)6(13)4(11)2-9/h3,5-10,12-14H,1-2H2/t3-,5-,6-,7-/m1/s1 Key: HSNZZMHEPUFJNZ-SHUUEZRQBR
- SMILES: O=C([C@@H](O)[C@H](O)[C@H](O)[C@H](O)CO)CO

Properties
Chemical formula	C_{7}H_{14}O_{7}
Molar mass	210.182 g·mol^{−1}
- Except where otherwise noted, data are given for materials in their standard state (at 25 °C [77 °F], 100 kPa). verify (what is ?) Infobox references

Sedoheptulose or pseudoheptulose or D-altro-heptulose is a ketoheptose—a monosaccharide with seven carbon atoms and a ketone functional group. It is one of the few heptoses found in nature, and is found in various fruits and vegetables ranging from carrots and leeks to figs, mangos and avocados.

It is an intermediate in respiratory and photosynthetic pathways and plays a vital role in the non-oxidative branch of the pentose phosphate pathway.

Studies have shown that 7-O-galloyl-D-sedoheptulose, a chemical extracted from dogwood fruit, is able to reduce pro-inflammatory markers in vivo such as interleukin-6 (IL-6) and C-reactive protein and thus might be able reduce low-level inflammation in humans. While this compound contains a sedoheptulose moiety, sedoheptulose itself has not been shown to possess the same properties.

== See also ==
- Sedoheptulose 7-phosphate
