= Sedoheptulose 7-phosphate =

Names
- IUPAC name D-altro-Hept-2-ulose 7-phosphate

Identifiers
CAS Number	2646-35-7
3D model (JSmol)	Interactive image
ChEBI	CHEBI:15721
ChemSpider	144663
MeSH	sedoheptulose+7-phosphate
PubChem CID	165007
- InChI: InChI=1S/C7H15O10P/c8-1-3(9)5(11)7(13)6(12)4(10)2-17-18(14,15)16/h4-8,10-13H,1-2H2,(H2,14,15,16)/t4-,5-,6-,7+/m1/s1 Key: JDTUMPKOJBQPKX-GBNDHIKLSA-N; InChI=1/C7H15O10P/c8-1-3(9)5(11)7(13)6(12)4(10)2-17-18(14,15)16/h4-8,10-13H,1-2H2,(H2,14,15,16)/t4-,5-,6-,7+/m1/s1 Key: JDTUMPKOJBQPKX-GBNDHIKLBF
- SMILES: O=P(O)(OC[C@@H](O)[C@@H](O)[C@@H](O)[C@H](O)C(=O)CO)O

Properties
Chemical formula	C_{7}H_{15}O_{10}P
Molar mass	290.161 g·mol^{−1}
- Except where otherwise noted, data are given for materials in their standard state (at 25 °C [77 °F], 100 kPa). verify (what is ?) Infobox references

Sedoheptulose 7-phosphate is an intermediate in the pentose phosphate pathway.

It is formed by transketolase and acted upon by transaldolase.

Sedoheptulokinase is an enzyme that uses sedoheptulose and ATP to produce ADP and sedoheptulose 7-phosphate.

Sedoheptulose-bisphosphatase is an enzyme that uses sedoheptulose 1,7-bisphosphate and H_{2}O to produce sedoheptulose 7-phosphate and phosphate.

== See also ==
- Sedoheptulose
- 3-Deoxy-D-arabino-heptulosonic acid 7-phosphate, a related compound and an intermediate in the biosynthesis of shikimic acid
