= Xylulose 5-phosphate =

Names
- IUPAC name 5-O-Phosphonato-D-xylulose
- Systematic IUPAC name d-threo-Pent-2-ulose 5-phosphate

Identifiers
| CAS Number | 60802-29-1 |
| 3D model (JSmol) | Interactive image |
| ChEBI | CHEBI:57737 |
| ChemSpider | 20015725 |
| MeSH | xylulose-5-phosphate |
| PubChem CID | 850 |
| CompTox Dashboard (EPA) | DTXSID601314181 |
- InChI: InChI=1S/C5H11O8P/c6-1-3(7)5(9)4(8)2-13-14(10,11)12/h4-6,8-9H,1-2H2,(H2,10,11,12)/p-2/t4-,5-/m1/s1 Key: FNZLKVNUWIIPSJ-RFZPGFLSSA-L
- SMILES: [O-]P([O-])(=O)OC[C@@H](O)[C@H](O)C(=O)CO

Properties
| Chemical formula | C_{5}H_{11}O_{8}P |
| Molar mass | 230.109 g·mol^{−1} |
- Except where otherwise noted, data are given for materials in their standard state (at 25 °C [77 °F], 100 kPa). verify (what is ?) Infobox references

D-Xylulose 5-phosphate (D-xylulose-5-P) is an intermediate in the pentose phosphate pathway. It is a ketose sugar formed from ribulose-5-phosphate by ribulose-5-phosphate epimerase. In the non-oxidative branch of the pentose phosphate pathway, xylulose-5-phosphate acts as a donor of two-carbon ketone groups in transketolase reactions.

Xylulose-5-phosphate also plays a crucial role in the regulation of glycolysis through its interaction with the bifunctional enzyme PFK2/FBPase2. Specifically, it activates protein phosphatase, which then dephosphorylates PFK2/FBPase2. This inactivates the FBPase2 activity of the bifunctional enzyme and activates its PFK2 activity. As a result, the production of fructose 2,6-bisphosphate increases, ultimately leading to an upregulation of glycolysis.

Although previously thought of mainly as an intermediary in the pentose phosphate pathway, recent research reported that the sugar also has a role in gene expression, mainly by promoting the ChREBP transcription factor in the well-fed state. However, more recent study showed that D-glucose-6-phosphate, rather than D-xylulose-5-phosphate, is essential for the activation of ChREBP in response to glucose.

== Enantiomers ==
L-Xylulose 5-phosphate is made by L-xylulokinase.
