= Ribose 5-phosphate =

Chemical compound

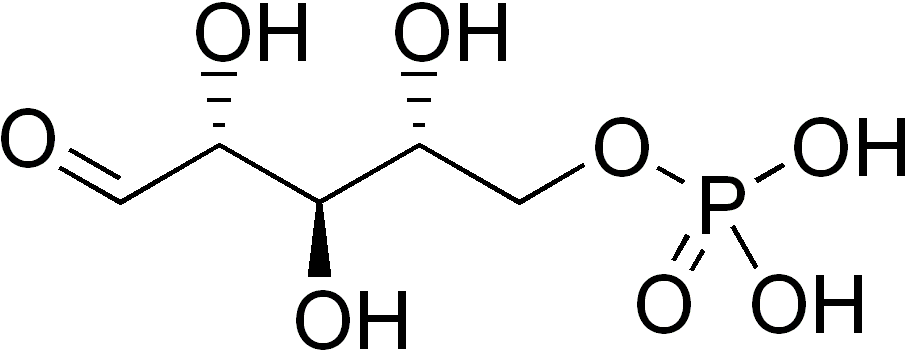

Names
- IUPAC name 5-O-Phosphono-D-ribose
- Other names Ribose 5-phosphate

Identifiers
CAS Number	4300-28-1
3D model (JSmol)	Interactive image
ChEBI	CHEBI:58273
ChemSpider	70368
ECHA InfoCard	100.022.101
MeSH	ribose-5-phosphate
PubChem CID	77982
UNII	4B2428FLTO
CompTox Dashboard (EPA)	DTXSID10897600
- InChI: InChI=1S/C5H11O8P/c6-1-3(7)5(9)4(8)2-13-14(10,11)12/h1,3-5,7-9H,2H2,(H2,10,11,12)/t3-,4+,5-/m0/s1 Key: PPQRONHOSHZGFQ-LMVFSUKVSA-N; InChI=1/C5H11O8P/c6-1-3(7)5(9)4(8)2-13-14(10,11)12/h1,3-5,7-9H,2H2,(H2,10,11,12)/t3-,4+,5-/m0/s1 Key: PPQRONHOSHZGFQ-LMVFSUKVBC
- SMILES: C([C@H]([C@H]([C@H](C=O)O)O)O)OP(=O)(O)O

Properties
Chemical formula	C_{5}H_{11}O_{8}P
Molar mass	230.110
- Except where otherwise noted, data are given for materials in their standard state (at 25 °C [77 °F], 100 kPa). verify (what is ?) Infobox references

Ribose 5-phosphate (R5P) is both a product and an intermediate of the pentose phosphate pathway. The last step of the oxidative reactions in the pentose phosphate pathway is the production of ribulose 5-phosphate. Depending on the body's state, ribulose 5-phosphate can reversibly isomerize to ribose 5-phosphate. Ribulose 5-phosphate can alternatively undergo a series of isomerizations as well as transaldolations and transketolations that result in the production of other pentose phosphates as well as fructose 6-phosphate and glyceraldehyde 3-phosphate (both intermediates in glycolysis).

The enzyme ribose-phosphate diphosphokinase converts ribose-5-phosphate into phosphoribosyl pyrophosphate.

== Structure ==
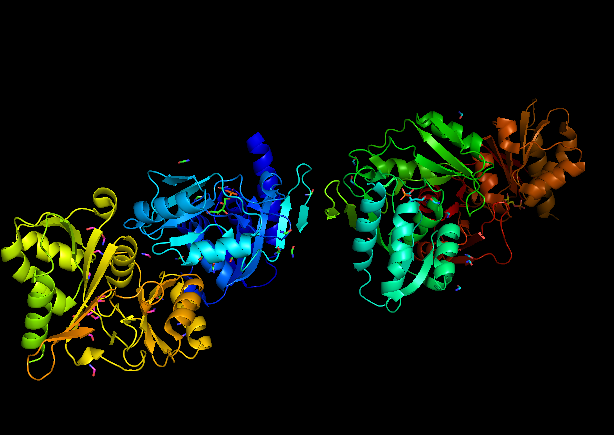
Crystal structure of ribose 5-phosphate isomerase and ribose 5-phosphate complex in E. coli

R5P consists of a five-carbon sugar, ribose, and a phosphate group at the five-position carbon. It can exist in open chain form or in furanose form. The furanose form is most commonly referred to as ribose 5-phosphoric acid.

== Biosynthesis ==
The formation of R5P is highly dependent on the cell growth and the need for NADPH (Nicotinamide adenine dinucleotide phosphate), R5P, and ATP (Adenosine triphosphate). Formation of each molecule is controlled by the flow of glucose 6-phosphate (G6P) in two different metabolic pathways: the pentose phosphate pathway and glycolysis. The relationship between the two pathways can be examined through different metabolic situations.

=== Pentose phosphate pathway ===
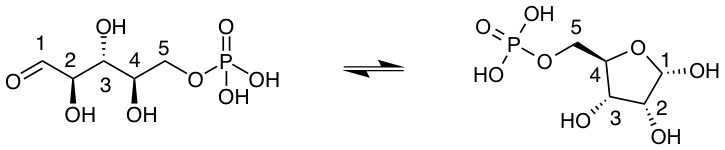
Conversion of ribose 5-phosphate open chain form to furanose form.

R5P is produced in the pentose phosphate pathway in all organisms. The pentose phosphate pathway (PPP) is a metabolic pathway that runs parallel to glycolysis. It is a crucial source for NADPH generation for reductive biosynthesis (e.g. fatty acid synthesis) and pentose sugars. The pathway consists of two phases: an oxidative phase that generates NADPH and a non-oxidative phase that involves the interconversion of sugars. In the oxidative phase of PPP, two molecules of NADP+ are reduced to NADPH through the conversion of G6P to ribulose 5-phosphate (Ru5P). In the non-oxidative of PPP, Ru5P can be converted to R5P through ribose-5-phosphate isomerase enzyme catalysis.

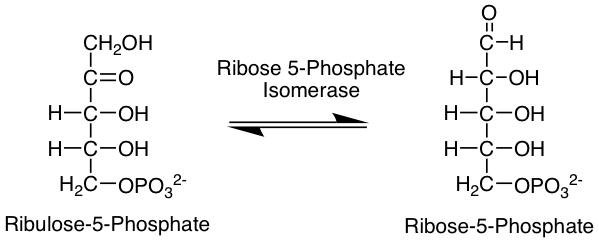
Isomerization of ribulose 5-phosphate to ribose 5-phosphate.

When demand for NADPH and R5P is balanced, G6P forms one Ru5P molecule through the PPP, generating two NADPH molecules and one R5P molecule.

=== Glycolysis ===
When more R5P is needed than NADPH, R5P can be formed through glycolytic intermediates. Glucose 6-phosphate is converted to fructose 6-phosphate (F6P) and glyceraldehyde 3-phosphate (G3P) during glycolysis. Transketolase and transaldolase convert two molecules of F6P and one molecule of G3P to three molecules of R5P. During rapid cell growth, higher quantities of R5P and NADPH are needed for nucleotide and fatty acid synthesis, respectively. Glycolytic intermediates can be diverted toward the non-oxidative phase of PPP by the expression of the gene for pyruvate kinase isozyme, PKM. PKM creates a bottleneck in the glycolytic pathway, allowing intermediates to be utilized by the PPP to synthesize NADPH and R5P. This process is further enabled by triosephosphate isomerase inhibition by phosphoenolpyruvate, the PKM substrate.

== Function ==
R5P and its derivatives serve as precursors to many biomolecules, including DNA, RNA, ATP, coenzyme A, FAD (Flavin adenine dinucleotide), and histidine.

=== Nucleotide biosynthesis ===
Nucleotides serve as the building blocks for nucleic acids, DNA and RNA. They are composed of a nitrogenous base, a pentose sugar, and at least one phosphate group. Nucleotides contain either a purine or a pyrimidine nitrogenous base. All intermediates in purine biosynthesis are constructed on a R5P "scaffold". R5P also serves as an important precursor to pyrimidine ribonucleotide synthesis.

During nucleotide biosynthesis, R5P undergoes activation by ribose-phosphate diphosphokinase (PRPS1) to form phosphoribosyl pyrophosphate (PRPP). Formation of PRPP is essential for both the de novo synthesis of purines and for the purine salvage pathway. The de novo synthesis pathway begins with the activation of R5P to PRPP, which is later catalyzed to become phosphoribosylamine, a nucleotide precursor. During the purine salvage pathway, phosphoribosyltransferases add PRPP to bases.

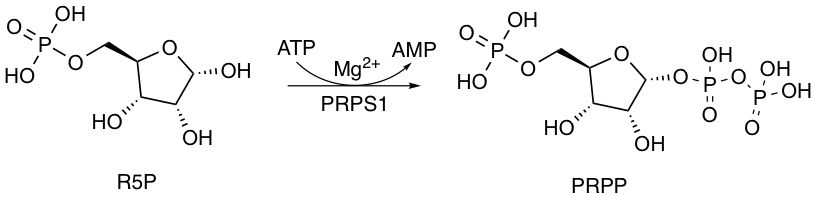
Activation of ribose 5-phosphate to phosphoribosyl pyrophosphate by ribose-phosphate diphosphokinase.

PRPP also plays an important role in pyrimidine ribonucleotide synthesis. During the fifth step of pyrimidine nucleotide synthesis, PRPP covalently links to orotate at the one-position carbon on the ribose unit. The reaction is catalyzed by orotate phosphoriboseyltransferase (PRPP transferase), yielding orotidine monophosphate (OMP).

=== Histidine biosynthesis ===
Histidine is an essential amino acid that is not synthesized de novo in humans. Like nucleotides, biosynthesis of histidine is initiated by the conversion of R5P to PRPP. The step of histidine biosynthesis is the condensation of ATP and PRPP by ATP-phosphoribosyl transferase, the rate determining enzyme. Histidine biosynthesis is carefully regulated by feedback inhibition/

=== Other functions ===
R5P can be converted to adenosine diphosphate ribose, which binds and activates the TRPM2 ion channel. The reaction is catalyzed by ribose-5-phosphate adenylyltransferase

== Disease relevance ==
Diseases have been linked to R5P imbalances in cells. Cancers and tumors show upregulated production of R5P correlated to increased RNA and DNA synthesis. Ribose 5-phosphate isomerase deficiency, the rarest disease in the world, is also linked to an imbalance of R5P. Although the molecular pathology of the disease is poorly understood, hypotheses included decreased RNA synthesis. Another disease linked to R5P is gout. Higher levels of G6P lead to a buildup of glycolytic intermediates, that are diverted to R5P production. R5P converts to PRPP, which forces an overproduction of purines, leading to uric acid build up.

Accumulation of PRPP is found in Lesch-Nyhan Syndrome. The build up is caused by a deficiency of the enzyme hypoxanthine-guanine phosphoribosyltransferase (HGPRT), which leads to decreased nucleotide synthesis and an increase of uric acid production.

Superactivity in PRPS1, the enzyme that catalyzes the R5P to PRPP, has also been linked to gout, as well as neurodevelopmental impairment and sensorineural deafness.
