= Carbohydrate conformation =

Saccharide molecular structure

Carbohydrate conformation refers to the overall three-dimensional structure adopted by a carbohydrate (saccharide) molecule as a result of the through-bond and through-space physical forces it experiences arising from its molecular structure. The physical forces that dictate the three-dimensional shapes of all molecules—here, of all monosaccharide, oligosaccharide, and polysaccharide molecules—are sometimes summarily captured by such terms as "steric interactions" and "stereoelectronic effects" (see below).

Saccharide and other chemical conformations can be reasonably shown using two-dimensional structure representations that follow set conventions; these capture for a trained viewer an understanding of the three-dimensional structure via structure drawings (see organic chemistry article, and "3D Representations" section in molecular geometry article); they are also represented by stereograms on the two dimensional page, and increasingly using 3D display technologies on computer monitors.

Formally and quantitatively, conformation is captured by description of a molecule's angles—for example, sets of three sequential atoms (bond angles) and four sequential atoms (torsion angles, dihedral angles), where the locations and angular directions of non-bonding lone pair electrons must sometimes also be taken into account.

Conformations adopted by saccharide molecules in response to the physical forces arising from their bonding and nonbonding electrons, modified by the molecule's interactions with its aqueous or other solvent environment, strongly influence their reactivity with and recognition by other molecules (processes which in turn can alter conformation). Chemical transformations and biological signalling mediated by conformation-dependent molecular recognition between molecules underlie all essential processes in living organisms.

== Conformations of carbohydrates ==
=== Monosaccharide conformation ===
Pyranose and furanose forms can exist in different conformers and one can interconvert between the different conformations if an energy requirement is met. For the furanose system there are two possible conformers: twist (T) and envelope (E). In the pyranose system five conformers are possible: chair (C), boat (B), skew (S), half-chair (H) or envelope (E). In all cases there are four or more atoms that make up a plane. In order to define which atoms are above and below the plane one must orient the molecule so that the atoms are numbered clockwise when looking from the top. Atoms above the plane are prefixed as a superscript and atoms below the plane are suffixed as a subscript. If the ring oxygen is above or below the plane it must be prefixed or suffixed appropriately.

==== Conformational analysis ====
The chair conformation of six-membered rings have a dihedral angle of 60° between adjacent substituents thus usually making it the most stable conformer. Since there are two possible chair conformation steric and stereoelectronic effects such as the anomeric effect, 1,3-diaxial interactions, dipoles and intramolecular hydrogen bonding must be taken into consideration when looking at relative energies. Conformations with 1,3-diaxial interactions are usually disfavored due to steric congestion and can shift equilibrium to the other chair form (example: ^{1}C_{4} to ^{4}C_{1}). The size of the substituents greatly affects this equilibrium. However, intramolecular hydrogen bonding can be an example of a stabilizing 1,3-diaxial interaction. Dipoles also play a role in conformer stability, aligned dipoles lead to an increase in energy while opposed dipoles lead to a lowering of energy hence a stabilizing effect, this can be complicated by solvent effects. Polar solvents tend to stabilize aligned dipoles. All interaction must be taken into account when determining a preferred conformation.

Five-membered ring envelope conformation

Conformations of five-membered rings are limited to two, envelope and twist. The envelope conformation has four atoms in a plane while the twist form only has three. In the envelope form two different scenarios can be envisioned; one where the ring oxygen is in the four atom plane and one where it is puckered above or below the plane. When the ring oxygen is not in the plane the substituents eclipse and when it is in the plane torsional strain is relieved. Conformational analysis for the twist form is similar thus leading to the two forms being very close in energy.

==== Anomers and related effects ====
Anomers are diastereoisomers of glycosides, hemiacetals or related cyclic forms of sugars, or related molecules differing in configuration only at C-1. When the stereochemistry of the first carbon matches the stereochemistry of the last stereogenic center the sugar is the α-anomer when they are opposite the sugar is the β-anomer.

==== Anomeric effect ====
Anomers can be interconverted through a process known as mutarotation. The anomeric effect more accurately called the endo-anomeric effect is the propensity for heteroatoms at C-1 to be oriented axially. This is counter intuitive as one would expect the equatorially anomer to be the thermodynamic product. This effect has been rationalized through dipole–dipole repulsion and n–σ* arguments.

==== Reverse anomeric effect ====
The reverse anomeric effect, proposed in 1965 by R. U. Lemieux, is the tendency for electropositive groups at the anomeric position to be oriented equatorially. Original publication reported this phenomenon with N-(2,3,4,6-tetra-O-acetyl-α-D-glucopyranosyl)-4-methylpyridinium bromide. However, further studies have shown the effect to be a solvation and steric issue. It is accepted that there is no generalized reverse anomeric effect.

==== Hydroxymethyl conformation ====
Rotation around the C-5/C-6 bond is described by the angle ω. Three possible staggered conformations are possible:: gauche–trans (gt), gauche–gauche (gg), and trans–gauche (tg). The name indicates the interaction between O-5 and OH-6 first followed by the interaction between OH-6 and C-4.

=== Oligosaccharide conformation ===
In addition to the factors affecting monosaccharide residues, conformational analysis of oligosaccharides and polysaccharides requires consideration additional factors.

==== The exo-anomeric effect ====
The exo-anomeric effect is similar to the endo-anomeric effect. The difference being that the lone pair being donated is coming from the substituent at C-1. However, since the substituent can be either axial or equatorial there are two types of exo-anomeric effects, one from axial glycosides and one from equatorial glycosides as long as the donating orbital is anti-periplanar to the accepting orbital.

==== Glycosidic torsion angles ====
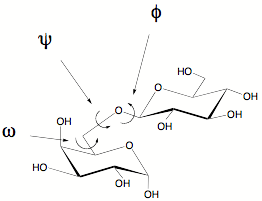

Three angles are described by φ, ψ and ω (in the case of glycosidic linkages via O-6). Steric considerations and anomeric effects need to be taken into consideration when looking at preferred angles.

=== Conformations in solution ===
In solution, reducing monosaccharides exist in equilibrium between their acyclic and cyclic forms with less than 1% in the acyclic form. The open chain form can close to give the pyranose and furanose with both the α- and β-anomers present for each. The equilibrium population of conformers depends on their relative energies which can be determined to a rough approximation using steric and stereoelectronic arguments. It has been shown that cations in solution can shift the equilibrium.

== See also ==
- Anomeric effect
- Carbohydrate
- Furanose
- Monosaccharide
- Polysaccharide
- Pyranose
