= Pyranose =

Class of saccharide compounds structured as a 5-carbon, 1-oxygen ring

In organic chemistry, pyranose is a collective term for sugars that have a chemical structure that includes a six-membered ring consisting of five carbon atoms and one oxygen atom (a heterocycle). There may be other carbons external to the ring. The name derives from its similarity to the oxygen heterocycle pyran, but the pyranose ring does not have double bonds. A pyranose in which the anomeric −OH (hydroxyl group) at C(l) has been converted into an OR group is called a pyranoside.

Tetrahydropyran
Name	Tetrahydropyran	α-D-(+)-Glucopyranose
structural formula	Tetrahydropyran	α-Glucopyranose
	Tetrahydropyrane ring highlighted blue	Tetrahydropyrane ring highlighted blue

== Formation ==
The pyranose ring is formed by the reaction of the hydroxyl group on carbon 5 (C-5) of a sugar with the aldehyde at carbon 1. This forms an intramolecular hemiacetal. If reaction is between the C-4 hydroxyl and the aldehyde, a furanose is formed instead. The pyranose form is thermodynamically more stable than the furanose form, which can be seen by the distribution of these two cyclic forms in solution.

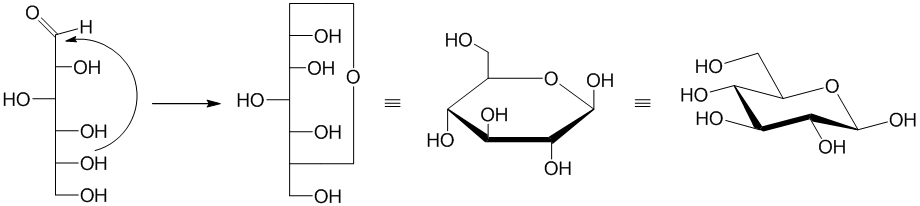
Formation of pyranose hemiacetal and representations of β-D-glucopyranose

== History ==
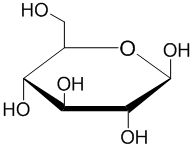
Haworth Projection of β-D-glucopyranose

Hermann Emil Fischer won the Nobel Prize in Chemistry (1902) for his work in determining the structure of the D-aldohexoses. However, the linear, free-aldehyde structures that Fischer proposed represent a very minor percentage of the forms that hexose sugars adopt in solution. It was Edmund Hirst and Clifford Purves, in the research group of Walter Haworth, who conclusively determined that the hexose sugars preferentially form a pyranose, or six-membered, ring. Haworth drew the ring as a flat hexagon with groups above and below the plane of the ring – the Haworth projection.

A further refinement to the conformation of pyranose rings came when Sponsler and Dore (1926) realized that Sachse's mathematical treatment of six-membered rings could be applied to their X-ray structure of cellulose. It was determined that the pyranose ring is puckered, to allow all of the carbon atoms of the ring to have close to the ideal tetrahedral geometry.

== Conformations ==
This puckering leads to a total of 38 distinct basic pyranose conformations: 2 chairs, 6 boats, 6 skew-boats, 12 half-chairs, and 12 envelopes.

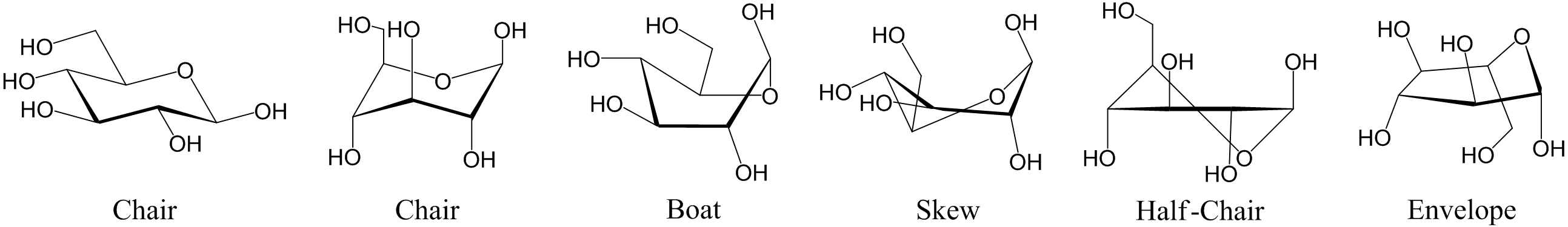
Conformations of β-D-glucopyranose

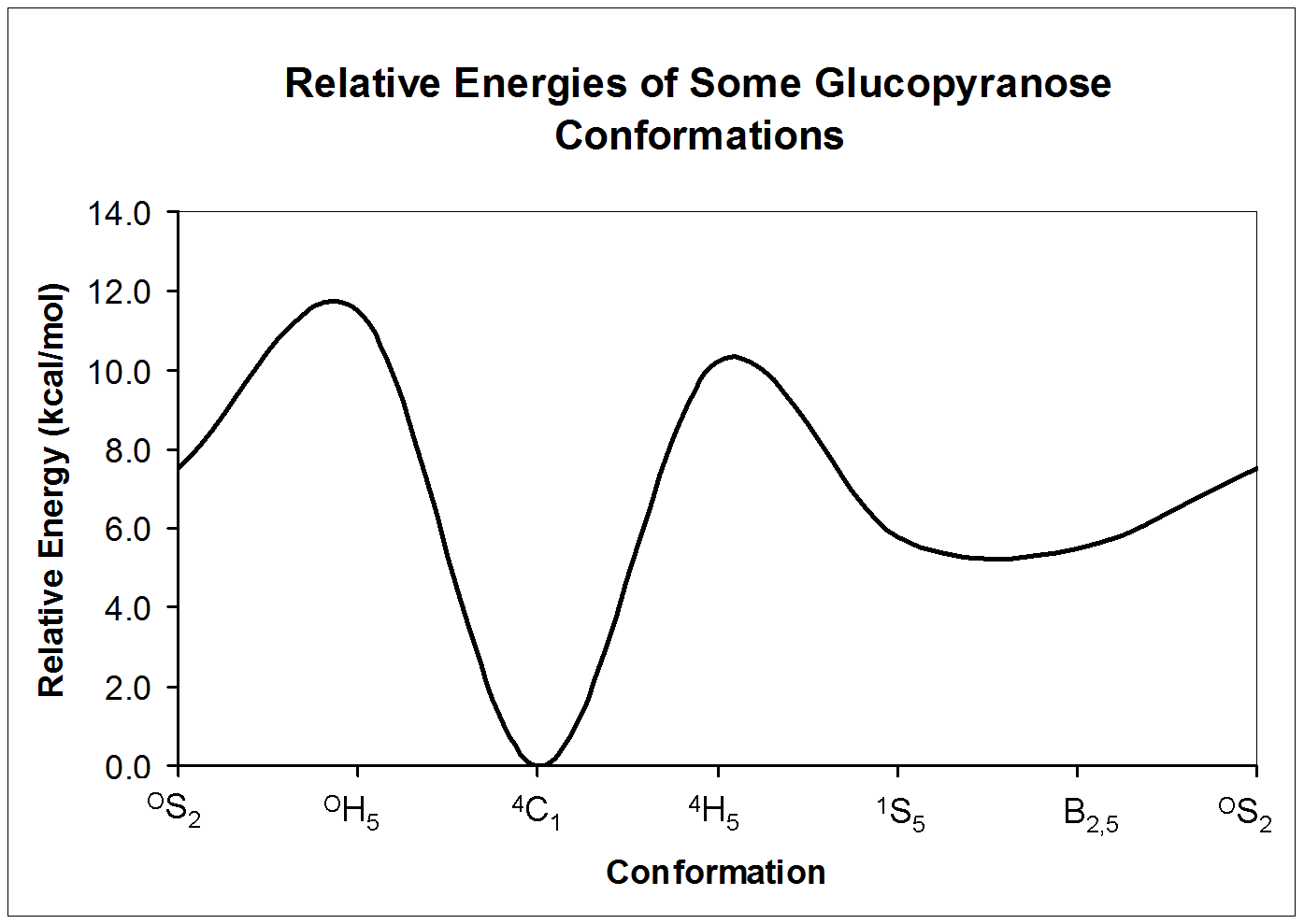
Relative energy of β-D-glucopyranose conformers

These conformers can interconvert with one another; however, each form may have very different relative energy, so a significant barrier to interconversion may be present. The energy of these conformations can be calculated from quantum mechanics; an example of possible glucopyranose interconversions is given.

The conformations of the pyranose ring are superficially similar to that of the cyclohexane ring. However, the specific nomenclature of pyranoses includes reference to the ring oxygen, and the presence of hydroxyls on the ring have distinct effects on its conformational preference. There are also conformational and stereochemical effects specific to the pyranose ring.

=== Nomenclature ===
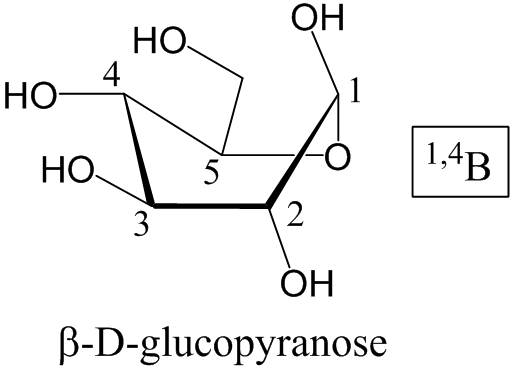
Nomenclature example: β-D-glucopyranose

To name conformations of pyranose, first the conformer is determined. The common conformers are similar to those found in cyclohexane, and these form the basis of the name. Common conformations are chair (C), boat (B), skew (S), half-chair (H) or envelope (E). The ring atoms are then numbered; the anomeric, or hemiacetal, carbon is always 1. Oxygen atoms in the structure are, in general, referred to by the carbon atom they are attached to in the acyclic form, and designated O. Then:

- Position the ring so that, if looking at the top face, the atoms are numbered clockwise.
- In the chair and skew conformations, the reference plane should be selected. In the chair conformation, the reference plane is chosen such that the lowest-numbered atom (usually C-1) is exoplanar. In the skew conformation, the plane contains three adjacent atoms and one other with the atom with the lowest possible number exoplanar.
- Atoms above the plane are written before the conformer label, as a superscript
- Atoms below the plane are written following the conformer label, as a subscript

== NMR spectroscopy ==
As shown by the relative structure energies in the diagram above, the chair structures are the most stable carbohydrate form. This relatively defined and stable conformation means that the hydrogen atoms of the pyranose ring are held at relatively constant angles to one another. Carbohydrate NMR takes advantage of these dihedral angles to determine the configuration of each of the hydroxyl groups around the ring.

== See also ==
- Furanose
- Mutarotation
- Monosaccharide
- Carbohydrate conformation
