= C2H4F2 =

The molecular formula C_{2}H_{4}F_{2} (molar mass: 66.05 g/mol, exact mass: 66.0281 u) may refer to:

- 1,1-Difluoroethane (or DFE)
- 1,2-Difluoroethane (HFC-152)
