= Furanose =

Cyclic carbohydrate

Beta-d-fructofuranose

A furanose is a collective term for carbohydrates that have a chemical structure that includes a five-membered ring system consisting of four carbon atoms and one oxygen atom. The name derives from its similarity to the oxygen heterocycle furan, but the furanose ring does not have double bonds.

== Structural properties ==
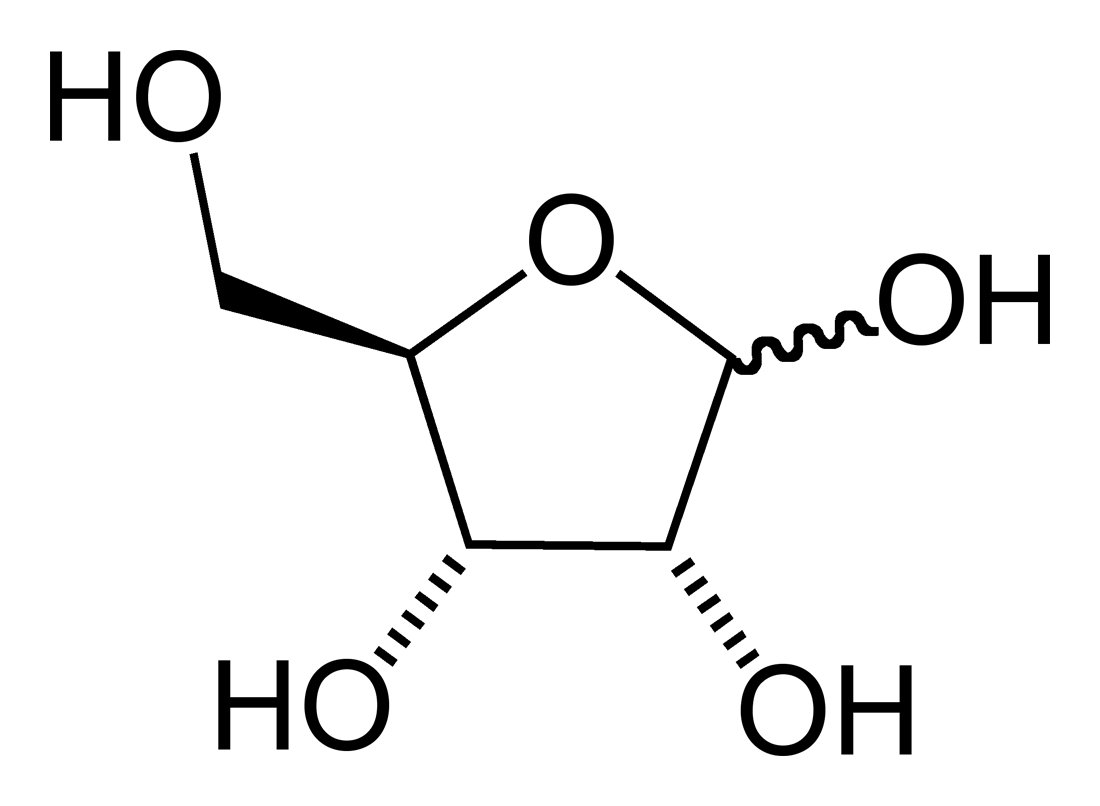
The chemical structure of ribose in its furanose form. The wavy bond indicates a mixture of β-ribofuranose and α-ribofuranose.

The furanose ring is a cyclic hemiacetal of an aldopentose or a cyclic hemiketal of a ketohexose.

A furanose ring structure consists of four carbon and one oxygen atom with the anomeric carbon to the right of the oxygen. The highest numbered chiral carbon (typically to the left of the oxygen in a Haworth projection) determines whether or not the structure has a d-configuration or L-configuration. In an l-configuration furanose, the substituent on the highest numbered chiral carbon is pointed downwards out of the plane, and in a D-configuration furanose, the highest numbered chiral carbon is facing upwards.

The furanose ring will have either alpha or beta configuration, depending on which direction the anomeric hydroxy group is pointing. In a d-configuration furanose, alpha configuration has the hydroxy pointing down, and beta has the hydroxy pointing up. It is the opposite in an l-configuration furanose. Typically, the anomeric carbon undergoes mutarotation in solution, and the result is an equilibrium mixture of α and β configurations.

== See also ==
- Pyranose
