= Gauche effect =

Molecular-structural phenomenon

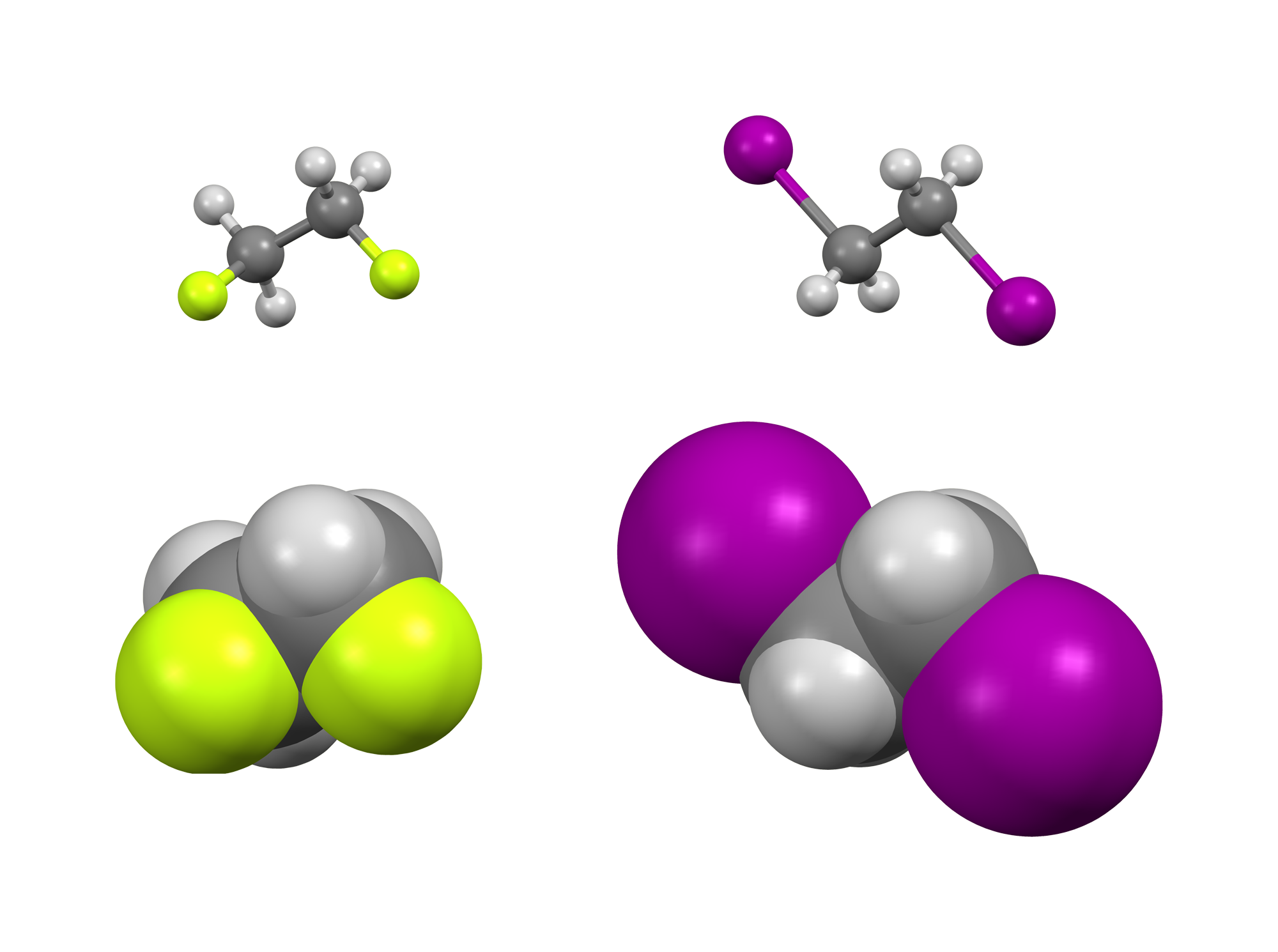
The gauche effect is illustrated by the fact 1,2-difluoroethane (left) adopts a gauche conformation whereas 1,2-diiodoethane (right) adopts an anti conformation. The F–C–C–F dihedral angle is 68°, whereas the I–C–C–I dihedral angle is 180°.

In the study of conformational isomerism, the gauche effect is an atypical situation where a gauche conformation (groups separated by a torsion angle of approximately 60°) is more stable than the anti conformation (180°).

Relative conformation energy diagram of butane as a function of dihedral angle. A: antiperiplanar, anti or trans. B: synclinal or gauche. C: anticlinal or eclipsed. D: synperiplanar or cis.

There are both steric and electronic effects that affect the relative stability of conformers. Ordinarily, steric effects predominate to place large substituents far from each other. However, this is not the case for certain substituents, typically those that are highly electronegative. Instead, there is an electronic preference for these groups to be gauche. Typically studied examples include 1,2-difluoroethane (H_{2}FCCFH_{2}), ethylene glycol, and vicinal-difluoroalkyl structures.

In 1,2-difluoroethane, shown in two conformations (top) and corresponding Newman projections (bottom), the anti conformation (left) is less stable than the gauche conformation (right).

There are two main explanations for the gauche effect: hyperconjugation and bent bonds. In the hyperconjugation model, the donation of electron density from the C−H σ bonding orbital to the C−F σ^{*} antibonding orbital is considered the source of stabilization in the gauche isomer. Due to the greater electronegativity of fluorine, the C−H σ orbital is a better electron donor than the C−F σ orbital, while the C−F σ^{*} orbital is a better electron acceptor than the C−H σ^{*} orbital. Only the gauche conformation allows good overlap between the better donor and the better acceptor.

Hyperconjugation model for explaining the gauche effect in 1,2-difluoroethane

Key in the bent bond explanation of the gauche effect in difluoroethane is the increased p orbital character of both C−F bonds due to the large electronegativity of fluorine. As a result, electron density builds up above and below to the left and right of the central C−C bond. The resulting reduced orbital overlap can be partially compensated when a gauche conformation is assumed, forming a bent bond. Of these two models, hyperconjugation is generally considered the principal cause behind the gauche effect in difluoroethane.

The molecular geometry of both rotamers can be obtained experimentally by high-resolution infrared spectroscopy augmented with in silico work. In accordance with the model described above, the carbon–carbon bond length is higher for the anti-rotamer (151.4 pm vs. 150 pm). The steric repulsion between the fluorine atoms in the gauche rotamer causes increased CCF bond angles (by 3.2°) and increased FCCF dihedral angles (from the default 60° to 71°).

In the related compound 1,2-difluoro-1,2-diphenylethane, the threo isomer is found (by X-ray diffraction and from NMR coupling constants) to have an anti conformation between the two phenyl groups and the two fluorine groups and a gauche conformation is found for both groups for the erythro isomer. According to in silico results, this conformation is more stable by 0.21 kcal/mol (880 J/mol).

A gauche effect has also been reported for a molecule featuring an all-syn array of four consecutive fluoro substituents. The reaction to install the fourth one is stereoselective:

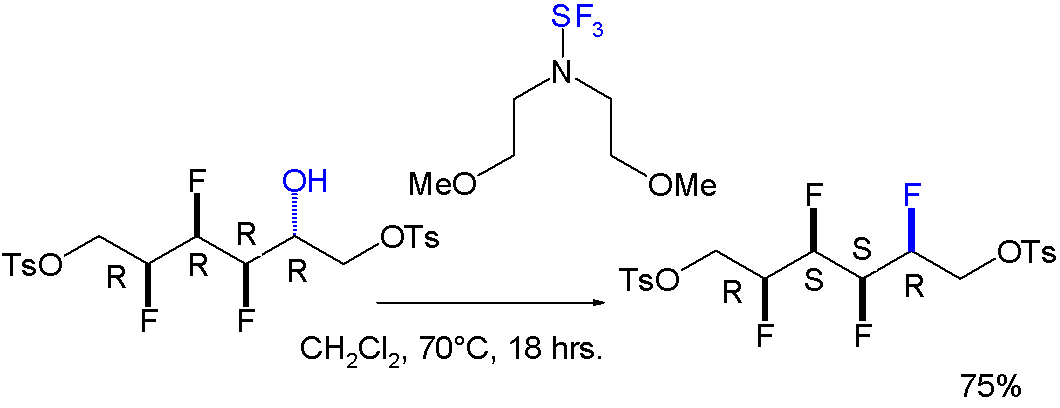
Synthesis of an All-syn Four Vicinal Fluorine Motif

The gauche effect is also seen in 1,2-dimethoxyethane and some vicinal-dinitroalkyl compounds.

The alkene cis effect is an analogous atypical stabilizing of certain alkenes.

== External influences ==
The gauche effect is very sensitive to solvent effects, due to the large difference in polarity between the two conformers. For example, 2,3-dinitro-2,3-dimethylbutane, which in the solid state exists only in the gauche conformation, prefers the gauche conformer in benzene solution by a ratio of 79:21, but in carbon tetrachloride, it prefers the anti conformer by a ratio of 58:42. Another case is trans-1,2 difluorocyclohexane, which has a larger preference for the di-equatorial conformer, rather than the anti-diaxial conformer, in more polar solvents.

== See also ==
- Anomeric effect
