= Anomer =

Form of stereoisomerism in carbohydrates

The α- and β-anomers of D-glucopyranose.

In carbohydrate chemistry, anomers (from Greek ἄνω 'up, above' and μέρος 'part') are specific types of stereoisomers found in sugars.

Many common sugars, such as glucose, exist in both a linear (or open-chain) form and a cyclic (or ring) form. The ring is formed when one end of the sugar molecule connects to the other end. The carbon atom where this ring closure occurs is called the anomeric carbon. Depending on the direction from which the connection is made, this anomeric carbon can have its new group (–OH) pointing in one of two distinct orientations, typically visualized as "up" or "down" in a standard diagram. These two resulting molecules are the anomers. Anomers are labeled with the Greek letters alpha (α) or beta (β) depending on whether the absolute configuration of the anomeric carbon and the most distant stereocenter from the anomeric carbon are the same (SS or RR giving the α configuration) or are different (SR or RS giving the β configuration).

More formally, an anomer is an epimer at the hemiacetal/hemiketal carbon atom in a cyclic saccharide. The process of one anomer converting to the other is known as anomerization caused by the continual breaking and reforming of the bond to form a ring. Sugars where this bond can break and reform continually in solution are known as reducing sugars due to the chemistry available in the linear form. For the reducing sugars present in biology, this process is known as mutarotation, catalyzed by dilute acid or base. Because they have different three-dimensional structures, anomers have distinct physical properties, such as melting point and specific rotation.

Importantly, when two sugars are joined together at the anomeric carbon of the second sugar, that second sugar is no longer capable of mutarotation, and the linkage between them is fixed as α or β. In biology, each sugar is typically only found in specific linkages such as α1,2 or β1,4 (a beta linkage between carbon 1, the anomeric carbon of the second sugar, and carbon 4 of the first sugar). This limit to the diversity of linkages is because enzymes are generally specific to a single type of linkage between two specific sugars and there are a limited number of glycosyltransferases catalyzing these connections. These linkages can be immunogenic when they are absent in an organism. As an important example, alpha-gal syndrome is caused by the prevalence of alpha-linked galactose in almost all animals, including human food sources, whereas it is absent in humans and other catarrhines (apes and Old World monkeys).

== Nomenclature ==
Different projections of α-D-glucopyranose. 1 = Fischer projection with C-1 at the top of the anomeric centre. C-5 is the anomeric reference atom. 2, 3 = Haworth projections. 4 = Mills projection.

Every two anomers are designated alpha (α) or beta (β), according to the configurational relationship between the anomeric centre and the anomeric reference atom, hence they are relative stereodescriptors. The anomeric centre in hemiacetals is the anomeric carbon C-1; in hemiketals, it is the carbon derived from the carbonyl of the ketone (e.g. C-2 in D-fructose). In aldohexoses the anomeric reference atom is the stereocenter that is farthest from the anomeric carbon in the ring (the configurational atom, defining the sugar as D or L). For example, in α-D-glucopyranose the reference atom is C-5.

If in the cyclic Fischer projection the exocyclic oxygen atom at the anomeric centre is cis (on the same side) to the exocyclic oxygen attached to the anomeric reference atom (in the OH group) the anomer is β. If the two oxygens are trans (on different sides) the anomer is α.

== Anomerization ==
Anomerization is the process of conversion of one anomer to the other. For reducing sugars, anomerization is referred to as mutarotation and occurs readily in solution and is catalyzed by acid and base. This reversible process typically leads to an anomeric mixture in which eventually an equilibrium is reached between the two single anomers.

The ratio of the two anomers is specific for a given sugar solution. For example, regardless of the configuration of the starting D-glucose, a solution will gradually move towards being a mixture of approximately 64% β-D-glucopyranoside and 36% of α-D-glucopyranose. As the ratio changes, the optical rotation of the mixture changes; this phenomenon is called mutarotation. While enantiomers have equal and opposite specific rotations, anomers (which are diastereomers) do not follow this rule and can have different specific rotations both in magnitude and sign.

The specific rotation $[\alpha]_\lambda^T$ is a physical property defined as the optical rotation $\alpha$ at a path length $l$ of 1 dm, a mass concentration $c$ (or density $\rho$ in pure compounds) in g/cm^{3}, a temperature $T$ (usually 20 °C) and a light wavelength $\lambda$ (usually sodium D line at 589.3 nm):

$$[\alpha]_\lambda^T = \frac{\alpha}{cl}$$

The values for specific rotation are reported in units of deg·cm^{3}·g^{−1}·dm^{−1}, which are typically shortened to just degrees, wherein the other components of the unit are tacitly assumed.

The amount of anomers present in the equilibrium mixture can be found if the specific rotations of the mixture $[\alpha]_m$ and the individual pure anomers $[\alpha]_i$ are known.

=== Mechanism of anomerization ===
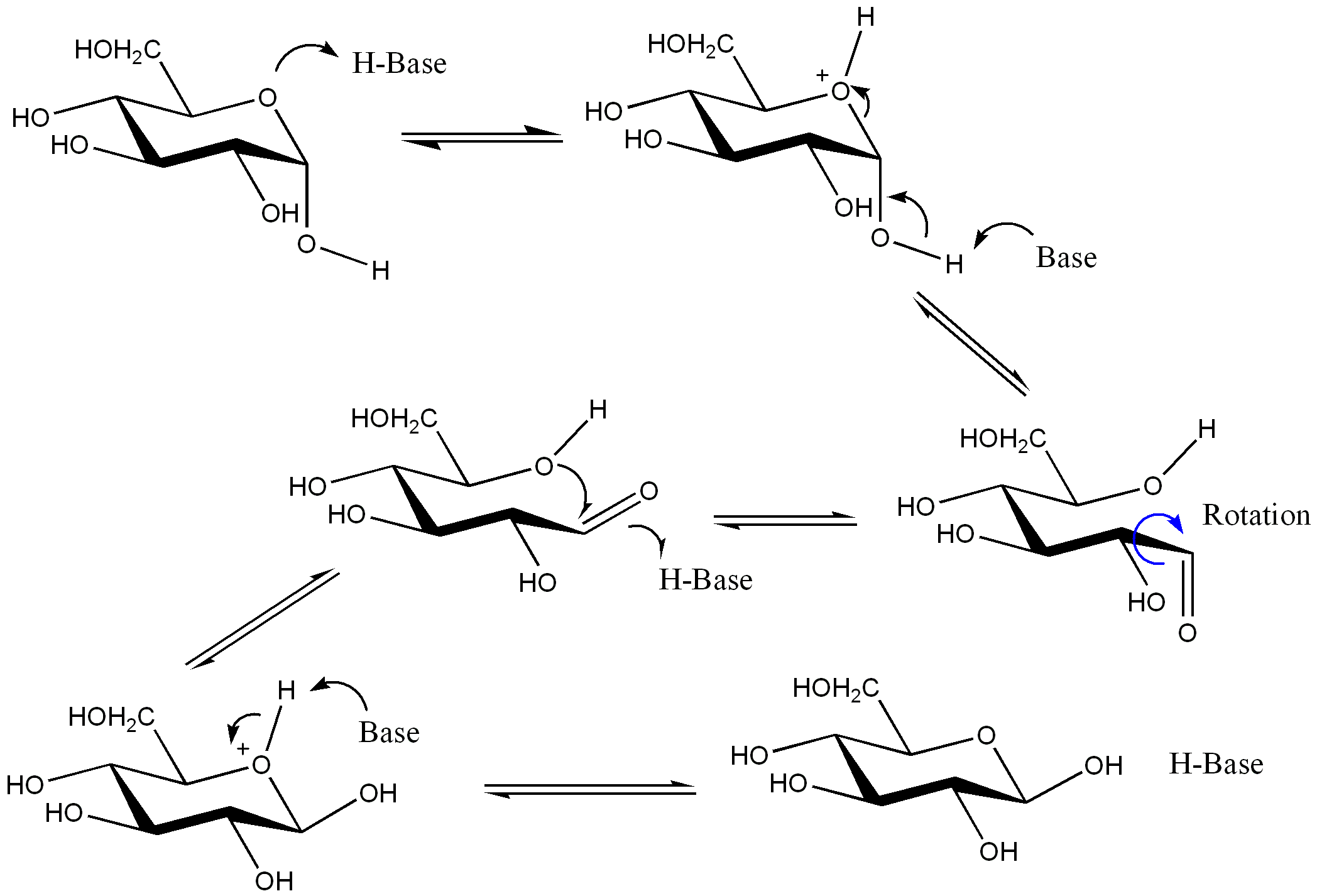
Open-chain form as an intermediate product between α and β anomer

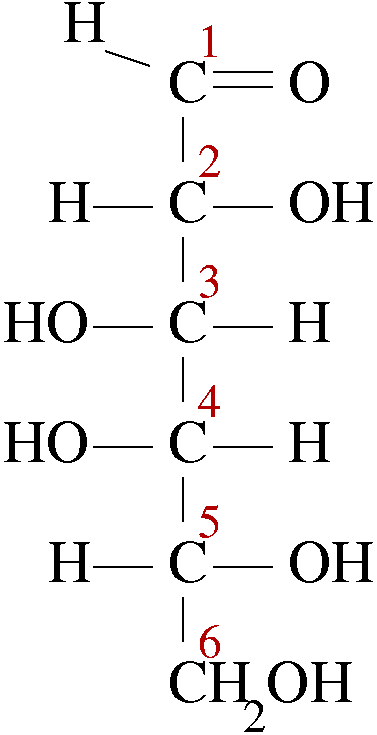
Open-chain form of D-galactose

Though the cyclic forms of sugars are usually heavily favoured, hemiacetals in aqueous solution are in equilibrium with their open-chain forms. In aldohexoses this equilibrium is established as the hemiacetal bond between C-1 (the carbon bound to two oxygens) and the C-5 oxygen. It is cleaved (forming the open-chain compound) and reformed (forming the cyclic compound). When the hemiacetal group is reformed, the OH group on C-5 may attack either of the two stereochemically distinct sides of the aldehyde group on C-1. Which side it attacks on determines whether the α- or β-anomer is formed.

Anomerization of glycosides typically occurs under acidic conditions. Typically, anomerization occurs through protonation of the exocyclic acetal oxygen, ionization to form an oxocarbenium ion with release of an alcohol, and nucleophilic attack by an alcohol on the reverse face of the oxocarbenium ion, followed by deprotonation.

== Physical properties and stability ==
Anomers are different in structure, and thus have different stabilizing and destabilizing effects from each other. The major contributors to the stability of a certain anomer are:

- The anomeric effect, which stabilizes the anomer that has an electron withdrawing group (typically an oxygen or nitrogen atom) in axial orientation on the ring. This effect is abolished in polar solvents such as water.
- 1,3-diaxial interactions, which usually destabilize the anomer that has the anomeric group in an axial orientation on the ring. This effect is especially noticeable in pyranoses and other six-membered ring compounds. This is a major factor in water.
- Hydrogen bonds between the anomeric group and other groups on the ring, leading to stabilization of the anomer.
- Dipolar repulsion between the anomeric group and other groups on the ring, leading to destabilization of the anomer.

For D-glucopyranoside, the β-anomer is the more stable anomer in water. For D-mannopyranose, the α-anomer is the more stable anomer.

Because anomers are diastereomers of each other, they often differ in physical and chemical properties. One of the most important physical properties that is used to study anomers is the specific rotation, which can be monitored by polarimetry.

== See also ==
- Monosaccharide nomenclature
- Stereochemistry
