= Electronic effect =

Influences on a molecule's properties not due to bonds or geometry

An electronic effect influences the structure, reactivity, or properties of a molecule but is neither a traditional bond nor a steric effect. In organic chemistry, the term stereoelectronic effect is also used to emphasize the relation between the electronic structure and the geometry (stereochemistry) of a molecule.

The term polar effect is sometimes used to refer to electronic effects, but also may have the more narrow definition of effects resulting from non-conjugated substituents.

== Types ==
=== Redistributive effects ===
Induction is the redistribution of electron density through a traditional sigma bonded structure according to the electronegativity of the atoms involved. The inductive effect drops across every sigma bond involved limiting its effect to only a few bonds.

Conjugation is a redistribution of electron density similar to induction but transmitted through interconnected pi-bonds. Conjugation is not only affected by electronegativity of the connected atoms but also affected by the position of electron lone pairs with respect to the pi-system. Electronic effects can be transmitted throughout a pi-system allowing their influence to extend further than induction.

In the context of electronic redistribution, an electron-withdrawing group (EWG) draws electrons away from a reaction center. When this center is an electron rich carbanion or an alkoxide anion, the presence of the electron-withdrawing substituent has a stabilizing effect. Similarly, an electron-releasing group (ERG) or electron-donating group (EDG) releases electrons into a reaction center and as such stabilizes electron deficient carbocations.

In electrophilic aromatic substitution and nucleophilic aromatic substitution, substituents are divided into activating groups and deactivating groups. Resonance electron-releasing groups are classed as activating, while Resonance electron-withdrawing groups are classed as deactivating.

=== Non-redistributive effects ===
Hyperconjugation is the stabilizing interaction that results from the interaction of the electrons in a sigma bond (usually C-H or C-C) with an adjacent empty (or partially filled) non-bonding p-orbital or antibonding π orbital or an antibonding sigma orbital to give an extended molecular orbital that increases the stability of the system. Hyperconjugation can be used to explain phenomena such as the gauche effect and anomeric effect.

Orbital symmetry is important when dealing with orbitals that contain directional components like p and d. An example of such an effect is square planar low-spin d^{8} transition metal complexes. These complexes exist as square planar complexes due to the directionality of the metal center's d orbitals despite fewer steric congestion in a tetrahedral geometric structure. This is simple one example of many varied examples, including aspects of pericyclic reactions such as the Diels-Alder reaction, among others.

Electrostatic interactions include both attractive and repulsive forces associated with the build-up of charge in a molecule. Electrostatic interactions are generally too weak to be considered traditional bonds or are prevented from forming a traditional bond, possibly by a steric effect. A bond is usually defined as two atoms approaching closer than the sum of their Van der Waal radii. Hydrogen bonding borders on being an actual "bond" and an electrostatic interaction. While an attractive electrostatic interaction is considered a "bond" if it gets too strong, a repulsive electrostatic interaction is always an electrostatic effect regardless of strength. An example of a repulsive effect is a molecule contorting to minimize the coulombic interactions of atoms that hold like charges.

Electronic spin state, at its simplest, describes the number of unpaired electrons in a molecule. Most molecules including the proteins, carbohydrates, and lipids that make up the majority of life have no unpaired electrons even when charged. Such molecules are called singlet molecules, since their paired electrons have only one spin state. In contrast, dioxygen under ambient conditions has two unpaired electrons. Dioxygen is a triplet molecule, since the two unpaired electrons allow for three spin states. The reaction of a triplet molecule with a singlet molecule is spin-forbidden. This is the major reason there is a very high reaction barrier for the extremely thermodynamically favorable reaction of singlet organic molecules with triplet oxygen. This kinetic barrier prevents life from bursting into flames at room temperature.

Electronic spin states are more complex for transition metals. To understand the reactivity of transition metals, it is essential to understand the concept of d electron configuration as well as high-spin and low-spin configuration. For example, a low-spin d^{8} transition metal complex is usually square planar, substitutionally inert, with no unpaired electrons. In contrast, a high-spin d^{8} transition metal complex is usually octahedral, substitutionally labile, with two unpaired electrons.

Jahn–Teller effect is the geometrical distortion of non-linear molecules under certain situations. Any non-linear molecule with a degenerate electronic ground state will undergo a geometrical distortion that removes that degeneracy. This has the effect of lowering the overall energy. The Jahn–Teller distortion is especially common in certain transition metal complexes; for example, copper(II) complexes with 9 d electrons.

Trans influence is the influence that a ligand in a square or octahedral complex has on the bond to the ligand trans to it. It is caused by electronic effects, and manifests itself as the lengthening of the trans bonds and as an effect on the overall energy of the complex.

== Comparison with steric effects ==
The structure, properties, and reactivity of a molecule are dependent on straightforward bonding interactions including covalent bonds, ionic bonds, hydrogen bonds, and other forms of bonding. This bonding supplies a basic molecular skeleton that is modified by repulsive forces generally considered steric effects. Basic bonding and steric effects are at times insufficient to explain many structures, properties, and reactivity. Thus, steric effects are often contrasted and complemented by electronic effects, implying the influence of effects such as induction, conjunction, orbital symmetry, electrostatic interactions, and spin state. There are more esoteric electronic effects but these are among the most important when considering chemical structure and reactivity.

A special computational procedure was developed to separate steric and electronic effects of an arbitrary group in the molecule and to reveal their influence on structure and reactivity.
