= Monosaccharide =

Simple sugars such as glucose and fructose

Monosaccharides (from Greek monos: single, sacchar: sugar), also called simple sugars, are a class of organic compounds usually with the formula (CH_{2}O)_{x}. By definition they have two or more carbon-carbon bonds. More specifically, they are classified as polyhydroxy aldehydes or polyhydroxy ketones with the respective formulas H-[CHOH]_{n}-CHO or H-[CHOH]_{m}-CO-[CHOH]_{n}-H respectively. Monosaccharides can be classified by the number x of carbon atoms they contain: triose (3), tetrose (4), pentose (5), hexose (6), heptose (7), and so on.

They are colorless, water-soluble, and crystalline organic solids. Most monosaccharides have a sweet taste.

Examples of monosaccharides include glucose (dextrose), fructose (levulose), and galactose. Monosaccharides are the building blocks of disaccharides (such as sucrose, lactose and maltose) and polysaccharides (such as cellulose and starch). The table sugar used in everyday vernacular is a disaccharide sucrose derived from the condensation of one molecule of each of the monosaccharides D-glucose and D-fructose.

The monosaccharide glucose plays a pivotal role in metabolism, where chemical energy is extracted through glycolysis and the citric acid cycle to provide energy to living organisms. Maltose is the dehydration condensate of two glucose molecules.

== Structure and nomenclature ==
Each carbon atom that supports a hydroxyl group is chiral, except those at the end of the chain. Saccharides of a given formula can exist as a number of isomeric forms. Each form has distinct properties, especially in a biological context. In addition to the many possible isomers for a given formula, each saccharide can exist in at least one cyclic form. The combination of these factors - many "chiral centers" and the chain-ring equilibria - gives rise to particularly complicated chemistry.

With few exceptions (e.g., deoxyribose), monosaccharides have the chemical formula (CH_{2}O)_{x}, where conventionally x ≥ 3. Glucose, used as an energy source and for the synthesis of starch, glycogen and cellulose, is a hexose. Ribose and deoxyribose (in RNA and DNA, respectively) are pentose sugars. Examples of heptoses include the ketoses mannoheptulose and sedoheptulose. Monosaccharides with eight or more carbons are rarely observed as they are quite unstable. In aqueous solutions monosaccharides exist as rings if they have more than four carbons.

=== Linear-chain monosaccharides ===
Simple monosaccharides have a linear and unbranched carbon skeleton with one carbonyl (C=O) functional group amid a linear chain of carbon atoms each of which has a hydroxyl (OH) group attached to it. Therefore, the molecular structure of a simple monosaccharide can be written as H(CHOH)_{n}(C=O)(CHOH)_{m}H, where n + 1 + m = x; so that its elemental formula is C_{x}H_{2x}O_{x}.

By convention, the carbon atoms are numbered from 1 to x along the backbone, starting from the end that is closest to the C=O group. Monosaccharides are the simplest units of carbohydrates and the simplest form of sugar.

If the carbonyl is at position 1 (that is, n or m is zero), the molecule begins with a formyl group H(C=O)− and is technically an aldehyde. In that case, the compound is termed an aldose. Otherwise, the molecule has a ketone group, a carbonyl −(C=O)− between two carbons; then it is formally a ketone, and is termed a ketose. Ketoses of biological interest usually have the carbonyl at position 2.

The various classifications above can be combined, resulting in names such as "aldohexose" and "ketotriose".

A more general nomenclature for open-chain monosaccharides combines a Greek prefix to indicate the number of carbons (tri-, tetr-, pent-, hex-, etc.) with the suffixes "-ose" for aldoses and "-ulose" for ketoses. In the latter case, if the carbonyl is not at position 2, its position is then indicated by a numeric infix. So, for example, H(C=O)(CHOH)_{4}H is pentose, H(CHOH)(C=O)(CHOH)_{3}H is pentulose, and H(CHOH)_{2}(C=O)(CHOH)_{2}H is pent-3-ulose.

=== Open-chain stereoisomers ===
Two monosaccharides with equivalent molecular graphs (same chain length and same carbonyl position) may still be distinct stereoisomers, whose molecules differ in spatial orientation. This happens only if the molecule contains a stereogenic center, specifically a carbon atom that is chiral (connected to four distinct molecular sub-structures). Those four bonds can have any of two configurations in space distinguished by their handedness. In a simple open-chain monosaccharide, every carbon is chiral except the first and the last atoms of the chain, and (in ketoses) the carbon with the keto group.

For example, the triketose H(CHOH)(C=O)(CHOH)H (glycerone, dihydroxyacetone) has no stereogenic center, and therefore exists as a single stereoisomer. The other triose, the aldose H(C=O)(CHOH)_{2}H (glyceraldehyde), has one chiral carbon—the central one, number 2—which is bonded to groups −H, −OH, −C(OH)H_{2}, and −(C=O)H. Therefore, it exists as two enantiomers, whose molecules are mirror images of each other (like a left and a right glove). Monosaccharides with four or more carbons may contain multiple chiral carbons, so they typically have more than two stereoisomers. The number of distinct stereoisomers with the same diagram is bounded by 2^{c}, where c is the total number of chiral carbons.

The Fischer projection is a systematic way of drawing the skeletal formula of an acyclic monosaccharide so that the handedness of each chiral carbon is well specified. Each stereoisomer of a simple open-chain monosaccharide can be identified by the positions (right or left) in the Fischer diagram of the chiral hydroxyls (the hydroxyls attached to the chiral carbons).

Most stereoisomers are themselves chiral (distinct from their mirror images). In the Fischer projection, two mirror-image isomers differ by having the positions of all chiral hydroxyls reversed right-to-left. Mirror-image isomers are chemically identical in non-chiral environments, but usually have very different biochemical properties and occurrences in nature.

While most stereoisomers can be arranged in pairs of mirror-image forms, there are some non-chiral stereoisomers that are identical to their mirror images, in spite of having chiral centers. This happens whenever the molecular graph is symmetrical, as in the 3-ketopentoses H(CHOH)_{2}(CO)(CHOH)_{2}H, and the two halves are mirror images of each other. In that case, mirroring is equivalent to a half-turn rotation. For this reason, there are only three distinct 3-ketopentose stereoisomers, even though the molecule has two chiral carbons.

Distinct stereoisomers that are not mirror-images of each other usually have different chemical properties, even in non-chiral environments. Therefore, each mirror pair and each non-chiral stereoisomer may be given a specific monosaccharide name. For example, there are 16 distinct aldohexose stereoisomers, but the name "glucose" means a specific pair of mirror-image aldohexoses. In the Fischer projection, one of the two glucose isomers has the hydroxyl at left on C3, and at right on C4 and C5; while the other isomer has the reversed pattern. These specific monosaccharide names have conventional three-letter abbreviations, like "Glu" for glucose and "Thr" for threose.

Generally, a monosaccharide with n asymmetrical carbons has 2^{n} stereoisomers. The number of open chain stereoisomers for an aldose monosaccharide is larger by one than that of a ketose monosaccharide of the same length. Every ketose will have 2^{(n−3)} stereoisomers where n > 2 is the number of carbons. Every aldose will have 2^{(n−2)} stereoisomers where n > 2 is the number of carbons. These are also referred to as epimers which have the different arrangement of −OH and −H groups at the asymmetric or chiral carbon atoms (this does not apply to those carbons having the carbonyl functional group).

=== Configuration of monosaccharides ===
Like many chiral molecules, the two stereoisomers of glyceraldehyde will gradually rotate the polarization direction of linearly polarized light as it passes through it, even in solution. The two stereoisomers are identified with the prefixes D- and L-, according to the sense of rotation: D-glyceraldehyde is dextrorotatory (rotates the polarization axis clockwise), while L-glyceraldehyde is levorotatory (rotates it counterclockwise).

D- and L-glucose

The D- and L- prefixes are also used with other monosaccharides, to distinguish two particular stereoisomers that are mirror-images of each other. For this purpose, one considers the chiral carbon that is furthest removed from the C=O group. Its four bonds must connect to −H, −OH, −CH_{2}(OH), and the rest of the molecule. If the molecule can be rotated in space so that the directions of those four groups match those of the analog groups in D-glyceraldehyde's C2, then the isomer receives the D- prefix. Otherwise, it receives the L- prefix.

In the Fischer projection, the D- and L- prefixes specifies the configuration at the carbon atom that is second from bottom: D- if the hydroxyl is on the right side, and L- if it is on the left side.

Note that the D- and L- prefixes do not indicate the direction of rotation of polarized light, which is a combined effect of the arrangement at all chiral centers. However, the two enantiomers will always rotate the light in opposite directions, by the same amount. See also d/l system.

=== Cyclisation of monosaccharides (hemiacetal formation) ===
A monosaccharide often switches from the acyclic (open-chain) form to a cyclic form, through a nucleophilic addition reaction between the carbonyl group and one of the hydroxyl groups of the same molecule. The reaction creates a ring of carbon atoms closed by one bridging oxygen atom. The resulting molecule has a hemiacetal or hemiketal group, depending on whether the linear form was an aldose or a ketose. The reaction is easily reversed, yielding the original open-chain form.

In these cyclic forms, the ring usually has five or six atoms. These forms are called furanoses and pyranoses, respectively—by analogy with furan and pyran, the simplest compounds with the same carbon-oxygen ring (although they lack the double bonds of these two molecules). For example, the aldohexose glucose may form a hemiacetal linkage between the aldehyde group on carbon 1 and the hydroxyl on carbon 4, yielding a molecule with a 5-membered ring, called glucofuranose. The same reaction can take place between carbons 1 and 5 to form a molecule with a 6-membered ring, called glucopyranose. Cyclic forms with a seven-atom ring (the same of oxepane), rarely encountered, are called heptoses.

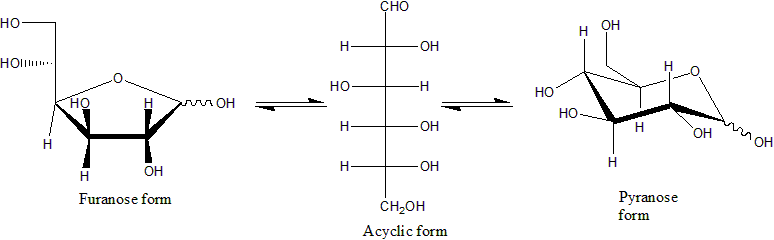
Conversion between the furanose, acyclic, and pyranose forms of D-glucose

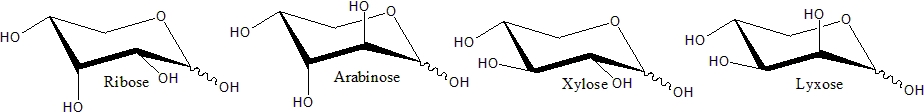
Pyranose forms of some pentose sugars

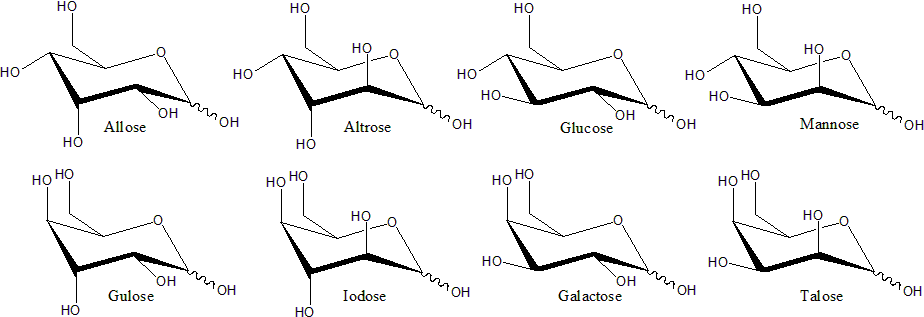
Pyranose forms of some hexose sugars

For many monosaccharides (including glucose), the cyclic forms predominate, in the solid state and in solutions, and therefore the same name commonly is used for the open- and closed-chain isomers. Thus, for example, the term "glucose" may signify glucofuranose, glucopyranose, the open-chain form, or a mixture of the three.

Cyclization creates a new stereogenic center at the carbonyl-bearing carbon. The −OH group that replaces the carbonyl's oxygen may end up in two distinct positions relative to the ring's midplane. Thus each open-chain monosaccharide yields two cyclic isomers (anomers), denoted by the prefixes α- and β-. The molecule can change between these two forms by a process called mutarotation, that consists in a reversal of the ring-forming reaction followed by another ring formation.

==== Haworth projection ====
The stereochemical structure of a cyclic monosaccharide can be represented in a Haworth projection. In this diagram, the α-isomer for the pyranose form of a D-aldohexose has the −OH of the anomeric carbon below the plane of the carbon atoms, while the β-isomer has the −OH of the anomeric carbon above the plane. Pyranoses typically adopt a chair conformation, similar to that of cyclohexane. In this conformation, the α-isomer has the −OH of the anomeric carbon in an axial position, whereas the β-isomer has the −OH of the anomeric carbon in equatorial position (considering D-aldohexose sugars).

α-D-Glucopyranose

β-D-Glucopyranose

==== Sigma Notation ====
A new method of recalling and representing structures of carbohydrates is widely known as sigma notation. This includes represeting the position of OH across the carbon through a number superscribed on sigma. The proposed sigma (σₙ) notation offers a simplified method to represent and recall the large number of stereoisomers found in carbohydrates, especially hexoses. Since hexoses can exist in over 100 structural variants, remembering each configuration is challenging. Inspired by the delta (Δ) notation used in fatty acid nomenclature, sigma notation is introduced to denote stereochemical arrangements. In this system, a sugar is represented as X–σⁿ, where X is the first letter of the sugar's name and the superscript "n" indicates the carbon positions where hydroxyl (OH) groups are oriented to the left in a Fischer projection.

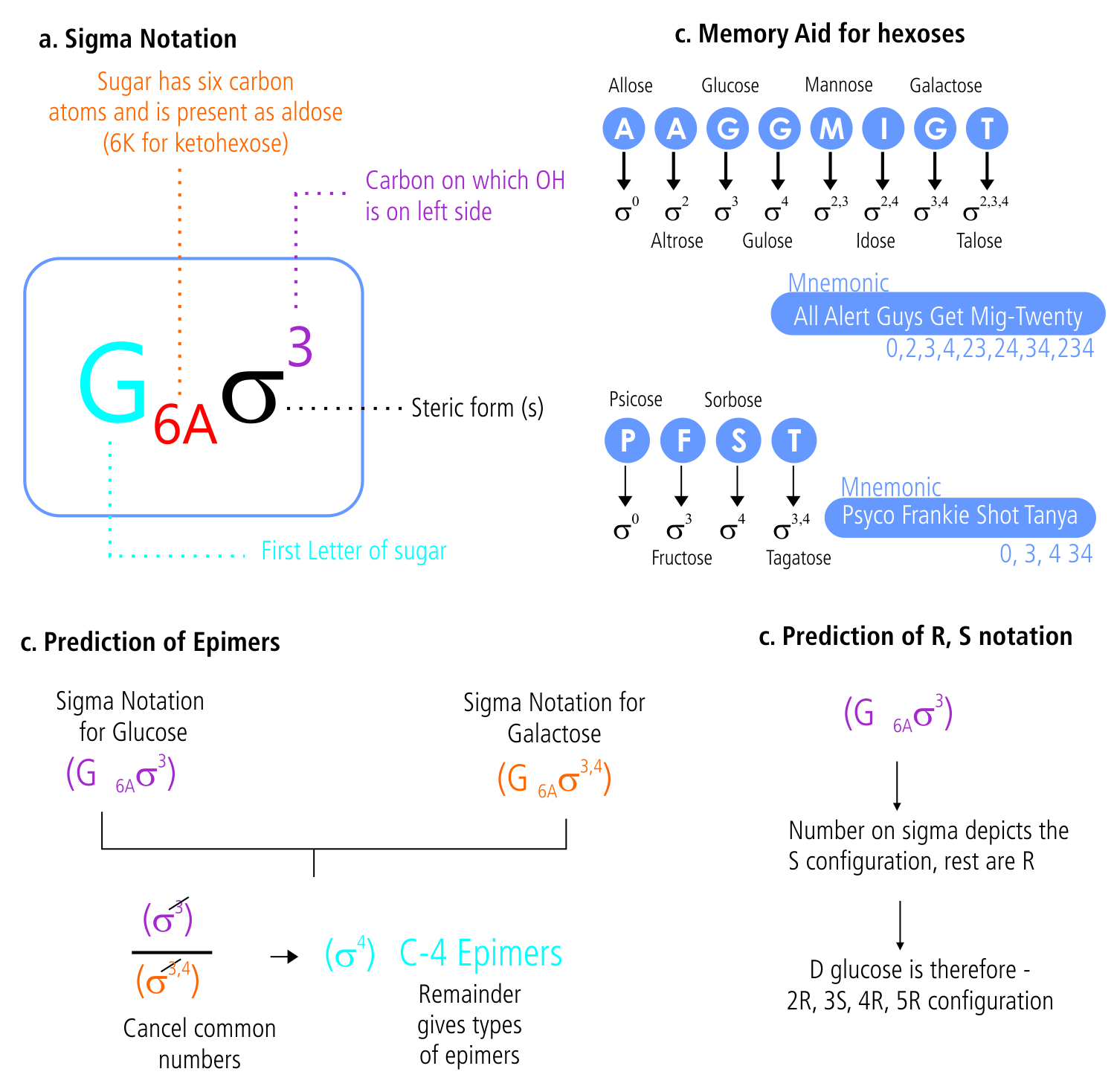

For aldohexoses (C₆H₁₂O₆), there are 16 stereoisomers—8 D-forms and 8 L-forms. Using D-allose as a reference (A–σ⁰, with no OH groups on the left), other sugars are assigned sigma values based on their OH positions. For example, Altrose is A–σ², Glucose is G–σ³, and Gulose is G–σ⁴. Sugars with multiple OH groups on the left have combined indices, such as Mannose (M–σ²,³) and Talose (T–σ²,³,⁴). A mnemonic (AA GG MIGT with respective sigma values) helps in recalling these structures. L-forms can be derived by flipping D-forms and adjusting sigma values accordingly.

Ketohexoses have fewer stereoisomers due to one less chiral center. Using D-psicose (σ⁰) as reference, fructose (σ³), sorbose (σ⁴), and tagatose (σ³,⁴) are assigned sigma notations.

Sigma notation also aids in identifying epimeric relationships, where sugars differ at a single carbon. By comparing sigma values, one can easily determine the position of variation, making this system a practical tool for understanding stereochemistry in carbohydrates.

== Derivatives ==
A large number of biologically important modified monosaccharides exist:

- Amino sugars such as:
  - galactosamine
  - glucosamine
  - sialic acid
  - N-acetylglucosamine
- Sulfosugars such as:
  - sulfoquinovose
- Others such as:
  - ascorbic acid
  - mannitol
  - glucuronic acid

== See also ==
- Monosaccharide nomenclature
- Reducing sugar
- Sugar acid
- Sugar alcohol

== Literature ==
- McMurry, John. Organic Chemistry. 7th ed. Belmont, CA: Thomson Brooks/Cole, 2008. Print.
