= Raymond Lemieux =

Canadian organic chemist (1920–2000)

Raymond Urgel Lemieux
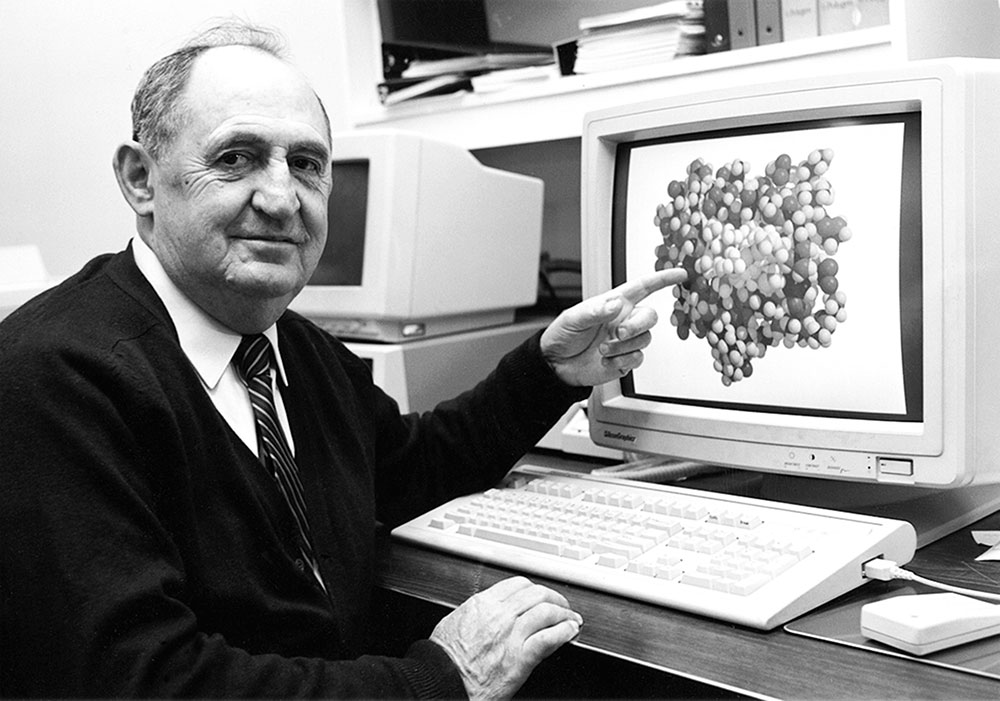
- Born: June 16, 1920; Lac La Biche, Alberta
- Died: July 22, 2000 (aged 80); Edmonton, Alberta
- Education: University of Alberta (B.Sc., Honor); McGill University (Ph.D.); Ohio State University (Postdoctoral)
- Known for: carbohydrate chemistry, the first synthesis of sucrose, anomeric effect, Lemieux-Johnson oxidation
- Awards: Officer of the Order of Canada (1968), Tishler Award (Harvard University, 1983), NSERC Gold Medal in Science (1991), Albert Einstein World Award of Science (1992), Companion of the Order of Canada (1994), Wolf Prize in Chemistry (1999)
- Scientific career
- Fields: Chemist
- Workplaces: University of Alberta; University of Ottawa; University of Saskatchewan; National Research Council

Raymond Urgel Lemieux, CC, AOE, FRS (June 16, 1920 – July 22, 2000) was a Canadian organic chemist, who pioneered many discoveries in the field of chemistry, his first and most famous being the synthesis of sucrose. His contributions include the discovery of the anomeric effect and the development of general methodologies for the synthesis of saccharides still employed in the area of carbohydrate chemistry. He was a fellow of the Royal Society of Canada and the Royal Society (England), and a recipient of the prestigious Albert Einstein World Award of Science and Wolf Prize in Chemistry.

== Life and career ==
Dr. Raymond U. Lemieux was born in Lac La Biche, Alberta, Canada. His family moved to Edmonton, Alberta in 1926. He studied chemistry at the University of Alberta and received a BSc with Honours in Chemistry in 1943. He went on to study at McGill University, where he received his PhD in Organic Chemistry in 1946. He won a post-doctoral scholarship at Ohio State University, where Bristol Laboratories Inc. sponsored his research on the structure of streptomycin. He met his future wife, a doctoral student, at Ohio State and they were married in 1948.

In following years, he returned to Canada where he spent two years as an assistant professor at the University of Saskatchewan. Next he served as Senior Research Officer at the National Research Council's Prairie Regional Laboratory in Saskatoon. In 1953 he and a fellow researcher, George Huber, were the first scientists to successfully synthesize sucrose. In 1954, he accepted the position of Dean in the Faculty of Pure and Applied Sciences at the University of Ottawa, where he established their Department of Chemistry. In 1961 he returned to the University of Alberta as a professor in the Chemistry Department and to serve as the chairman of the Organic Chemistry Division. He developed a method to make synthetic versions of oligosaccharides, which led to improved treatments for leukemia and hemophilia and the development of new antibiotics, blood reagents, and organ anti-rejection drugs.

While at the University of Alberta, he established a number of biochemical companies, including R&L Molecular Research Ltd. in 1962, Raylo Chemicals Ltd. in 1966 (which purchased R&L) and Chembiomed in 1977 (which has since been taken over by Synsorb Biotech of Calgary, Alberta.) Prof. Lemieux published an autobiography, entitled "Explorations with Sugars: How Sweet It Was," in 1990.

Dr. Raymond Lemieux died of an aneurysm in 2000.

In 1999, the University of Alberta Faculty of Science and Strathcona County established the Strathcona County/R.U. Lemieux Chair in Carbohydrate Chemistry. In 2001, the University of Alberta renamed the building(s) housing the Department of Chemistry to the Gunning/Lemieux Chemistry Centre to acknowledge the contributions of Profs. Raymond Lemieux and Harry Gunning.

== Awards ==
Dr. R.U. Lemieux received numerous awards and honours for his work in chemistry:

- Induction into the Royal Society of Canada (1954)
- C.S. Hudson Award of the American Chemical Society (1966)
- Became the first western Canadian to be elected a fellow of the Royal Society (England) (1967)
- Appointed Officer of the Order of Canada (1968)
- Haworth Award and Medal (1983)
- The Tishler Award, Harvard University (1983)
- Gairdner Foundation International Award (1985)
- Made Honorary Doctor of Philosophy from the University of Stockholm (1988)
- Induction into the Alberta Order of Excellence (1990)
- King Faisal International Prize for Science (first Canadian) (1990)
- NSERC Gold Medal in Science (1991)
- Albert Einstein World Award of Science (1992)
- Made Companion of the Order of Canada (1994)
- Wolf Prize in Chemistry (1999)

== Notable former trainees ==
- David R. Bundle, former postdoctoral fellow with Prof. Lemieux, currently professor of chemistry, the Raymond U. Lemieux Chair in Carbohydrate Chemistry, and a distinguished university professor at the University of Alberta, founder and former director of the Alberta Glycomics Centre (formerly known as Alberta Ingenuity Centre for Carbohydrate Science). http://www.chem.ualberta.ca/~glyco/who/index.htm
- Ole Hindsgaul, former PhD student with Prof. Lemieux, currently a distinguished professor at the Carlsberg Laboratory, Copenhagen, Denmark, and an adjunct professor, Department of Chemistry, University of Alberta, Canada. http://www.crc.dk/carbochem/oledraft2.htm

== Personal ==
Lemieux and Virginia (Jeannie) McConaghie met at Ohio State University where Virginia was working towards her Ph.D. in Physical Chemistry. They married in New York City in 1948, upon her graduation. They had seven children; their daughter Janet was a Canadian champion soccer player; she was inducted into the Canada Soccer Hall of Fame in 2021.

== See also ==
- Lemieux-Johnson oxidation
- Anomeric effect
- Carbohydrate chemistry
