= Saccharide =

Saccharide, a sugar, may refer to:

- Carbohydrate
- monosaccharides
- disaccharides
- trisaccharides
- tetrasaccharide
- oligosaccharides
- polysaccharides
