= 1,2-Difluoroethane =

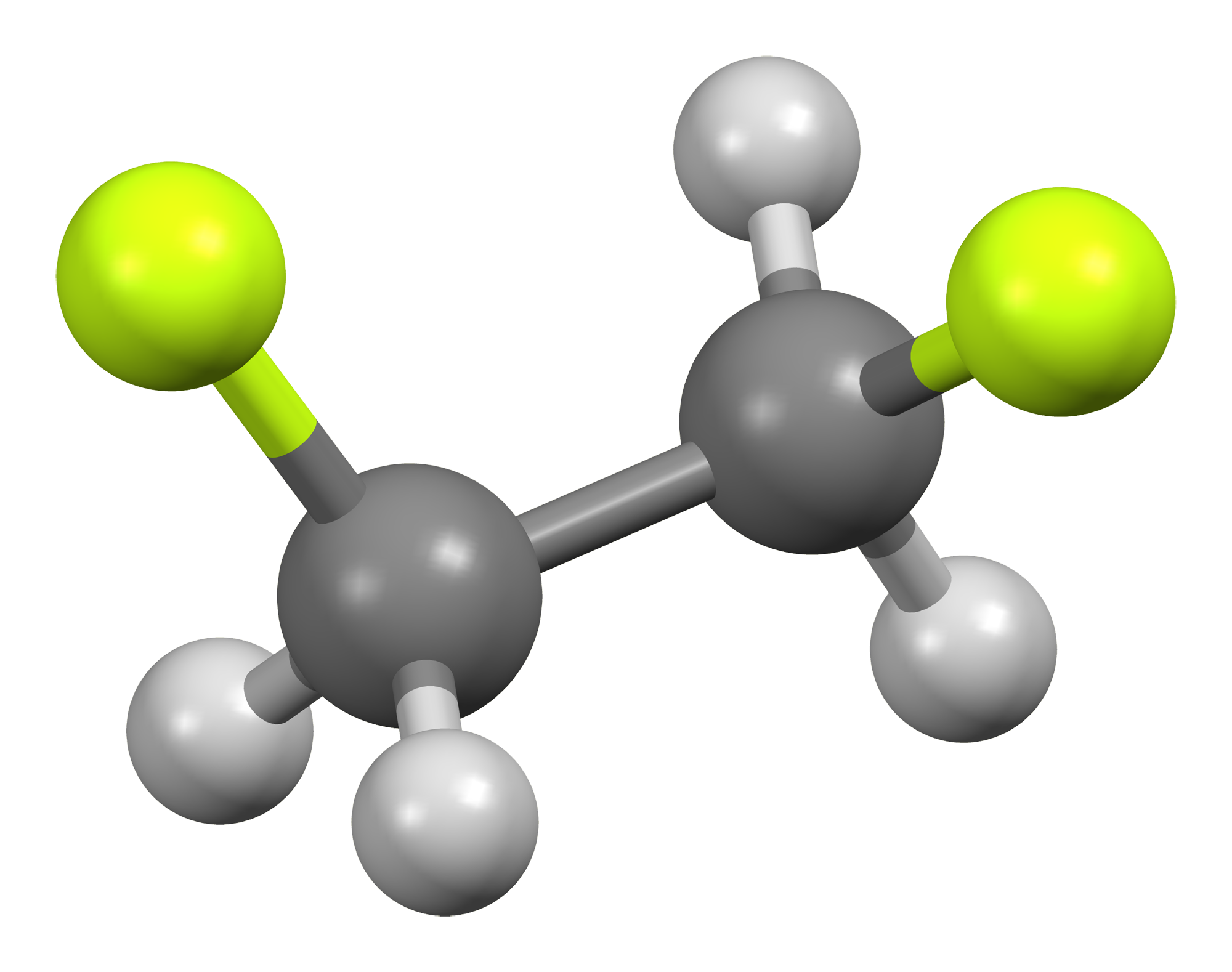

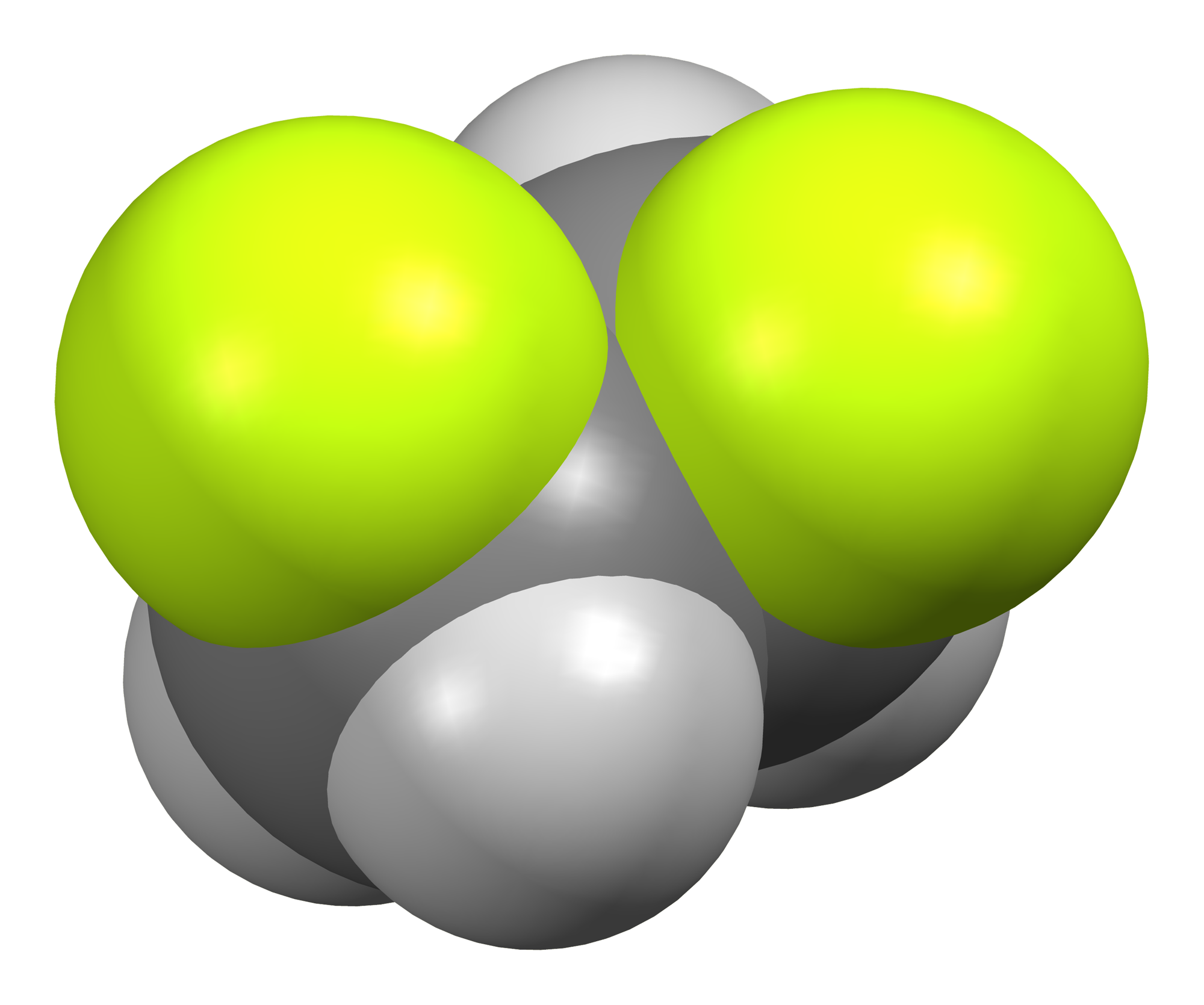

Names
- Preferred IUPAC name 1,2-Difluoroethane

Identifiers
CAS Number	624-72-6
3D model (JSmol)	Interactive image
ChemSpider	11722
ECHA InfoCard	100.259.147
EC Number	200-866-1
PubChem CID	12223
UNII	2IQ22ABI8P
CompTox Dashboard (EPA)	DTXSID3073214
- InChI: InChI=1S/C2H4F2/c3-1-2-4/h1-2H2 Key: AHFMSNDOYCFEPH-UHFFFAOYSA-N
- SMILES: C(CF)F

Properties
Chemical formula	C_{2}H_{4}F_{2}
Molar mass	66.051 g·mol^{−1}
Appearance	colourless liquid
Density	0.913
Melting point	−104 °C; −155 °F; 169 K
Boiling point	30.7 °C (87.3 °F; 303.8 K)
Solubility in water	2.31 g/L
Solubility	ether, benzene, chloroform
log P	1.21
Refractive index (n_{D})	1.28 (liquid)

Structure
Crystal structure	monoclinic
Space group	C2/c
Lattice constant	a = 7.775, b = 4.4973, c = 9.024 α = 90°, β = 101.73°, γ = 90° density 1.420
Lattice volume (V)	308.9
Formula units (Z)	4

Structure
Crystal structure	Orthorhombic
Space group	P2_{1}2_{1}2_{1}
Lattice constant	a = 8.047, b = 4.5086, c = 8.279 α = 90°, β = 101.73°, γ = 90° density 1.461
Lattice volume (V)	300.4
Formula units (Z)	4
- Except where otherwise noted, data are given for materials in their standard state (at 25 °C [77 °F], 100 kPa). (what is ?) Infobox references

1,2-Difluoroethane is a saturated hydrofluorocarbon containing an atom of fluorine attached to each of two carbons atoms. The formula can be written CH_{2}FCH_{2}F. It is an isomer of 1,1-difluoroethane. It has a HFC name of HFC-152 with no letter suffix. When cooled to cryogenic temperatures it can have different conformers, gauche and trans. In the liquid form these are about equally abundant and easily interconvert. As a gas it is mostly the gauche form.

In the HFC-152 designation, 2 means two fluorine atoms, 5 means 5 − 1 or four hydrogen atoms, and 1 means 1 + 1 or two carbon atoms.

== Formation ==
Ethylene reacts explosively with fluorine yielding a mixture of 1,2-difluoroethane and vinyl fluoride. With solid fluorine it will react when triggered by near-infrared radiation.

== Properties ==
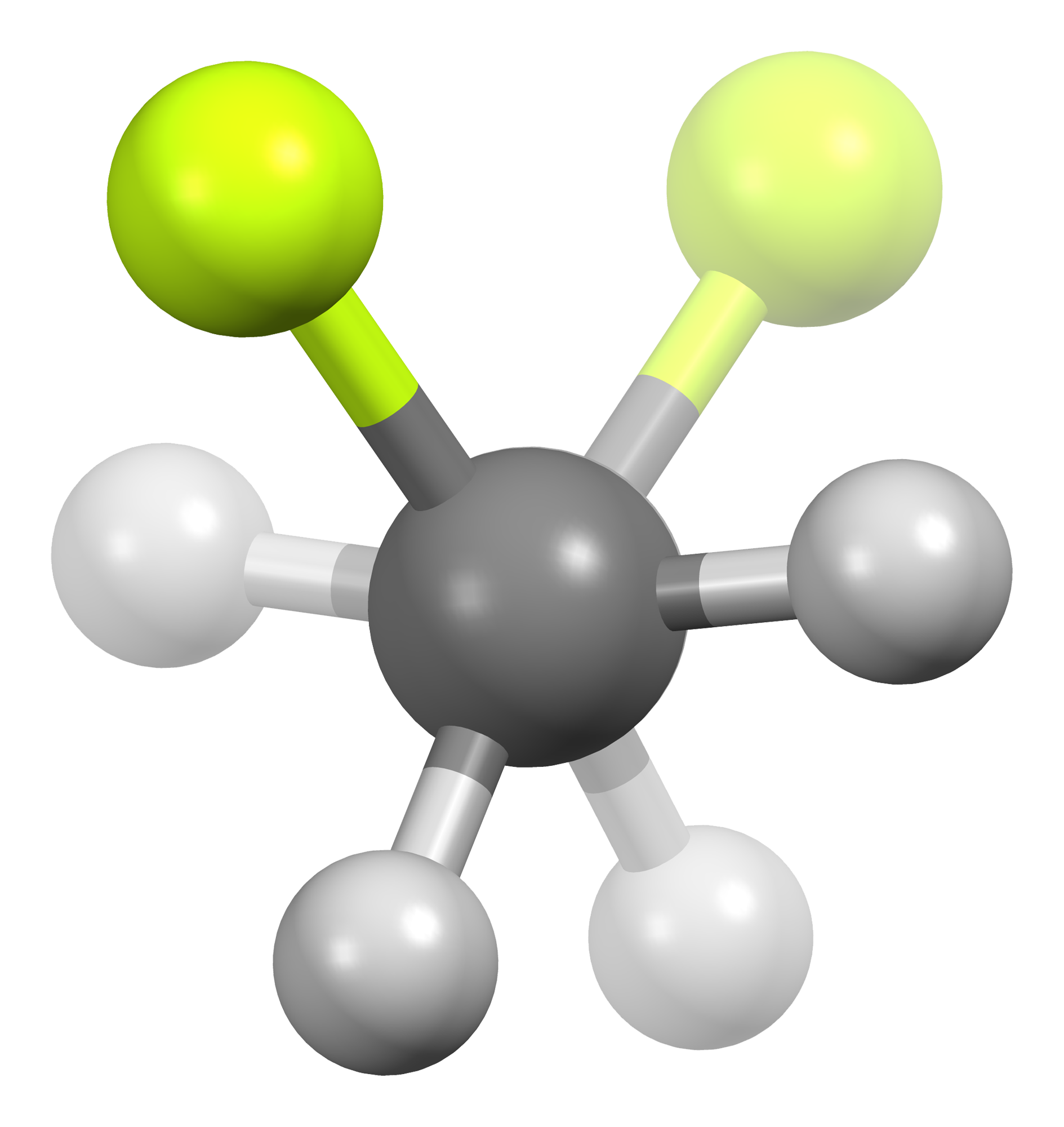
The F–C–C–F dihedral angle in 1,2-difluoroethane is 68° in the crystal structure.

The critical temperature of 1,2-difluoroethane is 107.5 °C.

If a C–H bond is over excited with too much vibration, the intramolecular vibrational relaxation takes 490 picoseconds.

The F–C–C–F dihedral angle is about 72°. Natural bond orbital deletion bond calculations show that 1,2-difluoroethane prefers the gauche conformation due to hyperconjugation effects. Since F is much more electronegative than the C atom, it will have greater electron density for the bonding orbital (carbon–fluorine bond). Thus, C will have larger σ* orbital, which is stabilized through C–H hyperconjugation. Thus cis C–H bonds and the C–F σ* interactions are significant. The dihedral angle of about 72° is a result of decreasing hyper conjugative stability and decreasing steric destabilization.

== Reactions ==
CH_{2}FCH_{2}F reacts with chlorine when treated with light. Two products are formed: CH_{2}FCCl_{2}F and CHClFCHClF. The proportions of each depends on the solvent.

== Uses ==
1,2-Difluoroethane is primarily used in refrigerants (39%), foam blowing agents (17%), solvents (14%), fluoropolymers (14%), sterilant gases (2%), aerosol propellants (2%), food freezants (1%), other (8%), and exports (3%).

== Safety ==
1,2-Difluoroethane is toxic when inhaled or when it comes into direct contact with the skin. Fluorocarbons are 4 to 5 times heavier than air, so it tends to concentrate in low-lying areas. This increases the risk of inhalation. 1,2-Difluoroethane is toxic to humans through several mechanisms. First, because it has a high density, it can displace oxygen in the lungs causing suffocation. In addition, inhaled fluorocarbons causes the myocardium to become more sensitive to catecholamines, which results in deadly cardiac arrhythmias.

When inhaled by rats, 1,2-difluoroethane is converted to fluoroacetate by cytochrome P450 and then to fluorocitrate, both toxic. 100 parts per million in the atmosphere was sufficient to poison rats in 30 minutes and to kill them in four hours. 1,2-Difluoroethane is likely to be similarly toxic to humans.

== Environmental fate ==
1,2-Difluoroethane can enter the environment in various ways. One way is through volatilization from rivers and lakes. Henry's law estimates that the volatilization half life from a model river is about 2.4 hours and 3.2 days from a model lake. When 1,2-difluoroethane is released to the environment, it will end up in the atmosphere. Here it is degraded by reaction with hydroxyl radicals and oxygen.

CH_{2}FCH_{2}F + OH → CH_{2}FCHF + H_{2}O

CH_{2}FCHF + O_{2} → CH_{2}FCHFO_{2} peroxy radical

CH_{2}FCHFO_{2} + NO → CH_{2}FCHFO alkoxy radical

When catalysed by chlorine atoms and oxidised by nitrogen oxides the end product is HCOF, which can decompose further to HF and CO.

The halflife in air is between 140 and 180 days.

== Control ==
1,2-Difluoroethane is a greenhouse gas when released to the atmosphere. It has a warming equivalent to 140 times that of carbon dioxide. As such it may be controlled by government regulation. The Australian government classifies 1,2-difluoroethane as an exotic synthetic greenhouse gas.
