= Mutarotation =

Change in optical rotation of a chiral substance due to interconversion of anomers

In stereochemistry, mutarotation is the change in optical rotation of a chiral material in a solution due to a change in proportion of the two constituent anomers (i.e. the interconversion of their respective stereocenters) until equilibrium is reached. Cyclic sugars show mutarotation as α and β anomeric forms interconvert. The optical rotation of the solution depends on the optical rotation of each anomer and their ratio in the solution.

Mutarotation was discovered by French chemist Augustin-Pierre Dubrunfaut in 1844, when he noticed that the specific rotation of aqueous sugar solution changes with time.

== Measurement ==
The α and β anomers are diastereomers of each other and usually have different specific rotations. A solution or liquid sample of a pure α anomer will rotate plane polarised light by a different amount and/or in the opposite direction than the pure β anomer of that compound. The optical rotation of the solution depends on the optical rotation of each anomer and their ratio in the solution.

For example, if a solution of β-D-glucopyranose is dissolved in water, its specific optical rotation will be +18.7°. Over time, some of the β-D-glucopyranose will undergo mutarotation to become α-D-glucopyranose, which has an optical rotation of +112.2°. The rotation of the solution will increase from +18.7° to an equilibrium value of +52.7° as some of the β form is converted to the α form. The equilibrium mixture is about 64% of β-D-glucopyranose and about 36% of α-D-glucopyranose, though there are also traces of the other forms including furanoses and open chained form.

The observed rotation of the sample is the weighted sum of the optical rotation of each anomer weighted by the amount of that anomer present. Therefore, one can use a polarimeter to measure the rotation of a sample and then calculate the ratio of the two anomers present from the enantiomeric excess, as long as one knows the rotation of each pure anomer. One can monitor the mutarotation process over time or determine the equilibrium mixture by observing the optical rotation and how it changes.

== Reaction mechanism ==
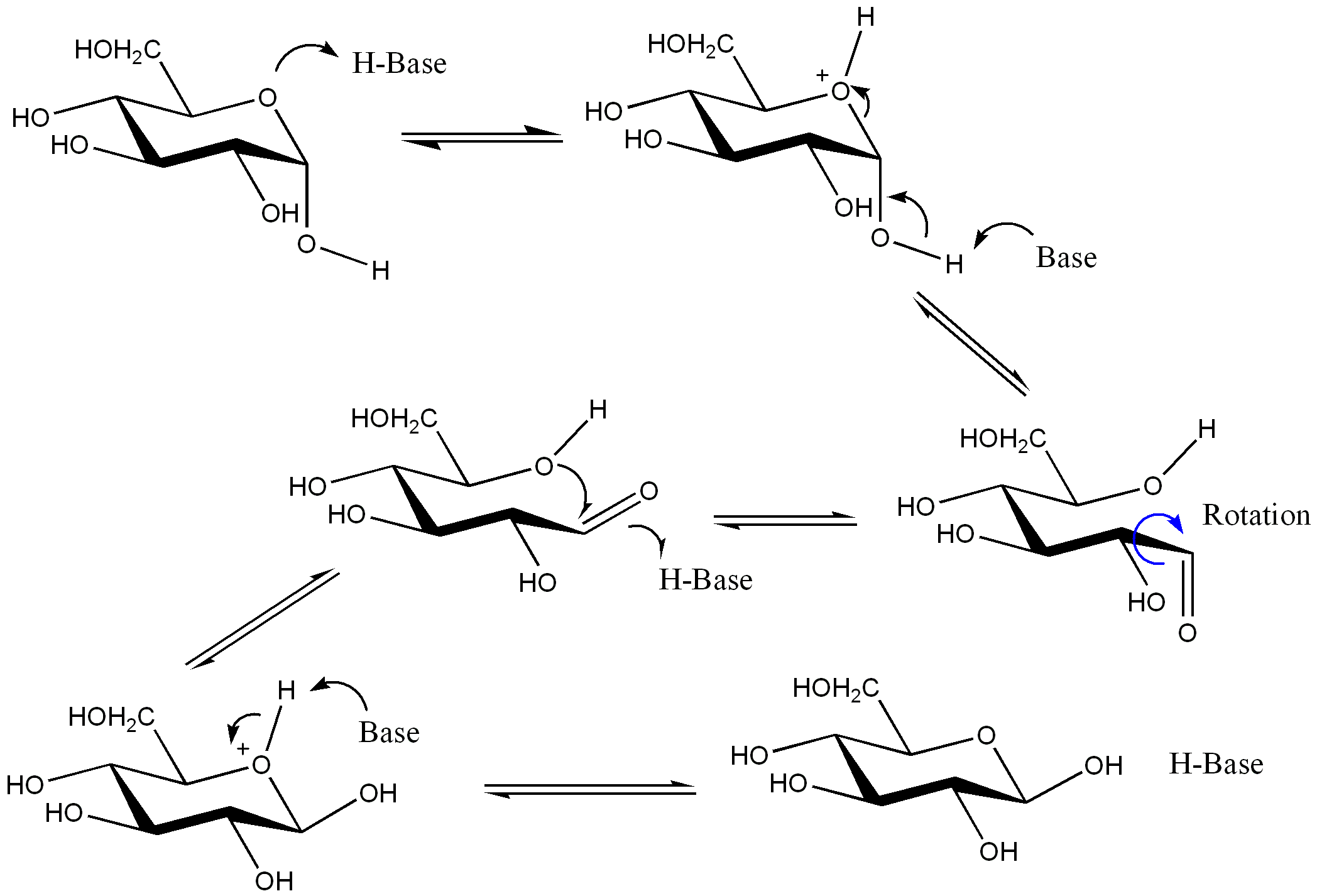
Reaction mechanism for the interconversion of α and β anomers

== See also ==
- Anomer
- Carbohydrate
- Monosaccharide
- Polysaccharide
- Stereochemistry
