= Hemiacetal =

Organic compound of the form >C(OH)O–

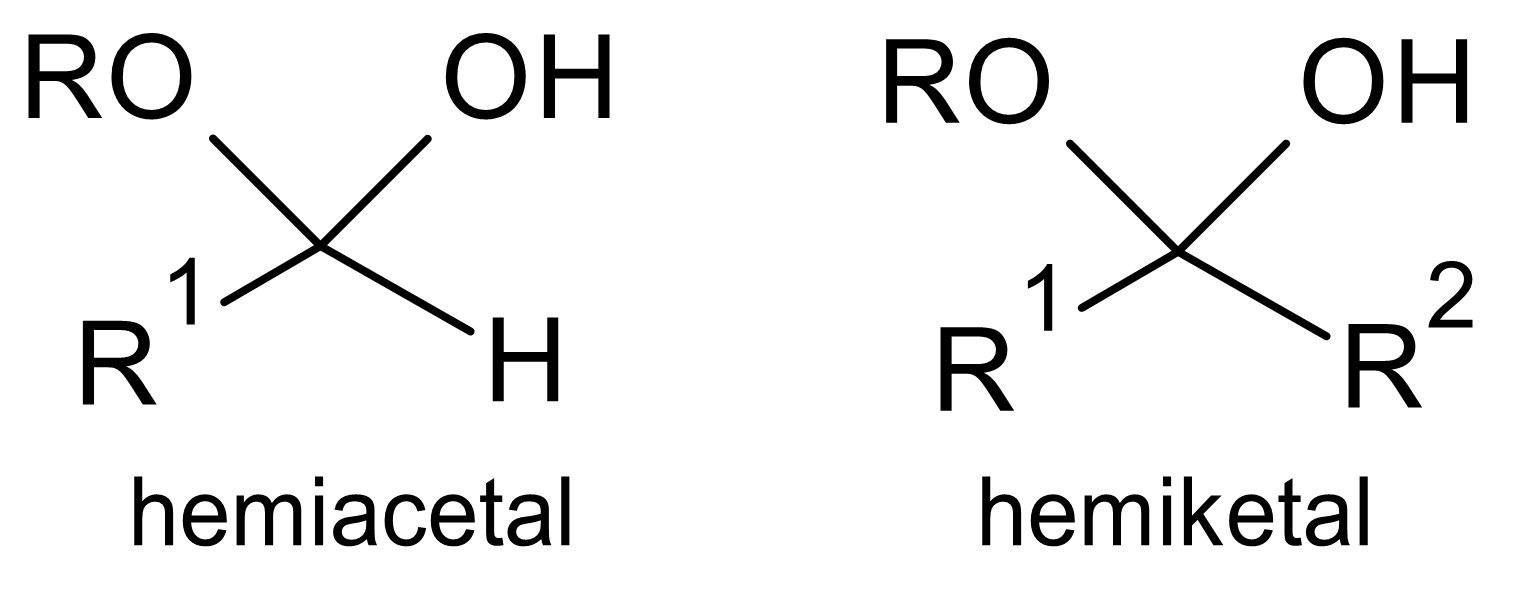
The general structure of a hemiacetal (left) and hemiketal (right).

In organic chemistry, a hemiacetal is a functional group with the general formula R^{1}R^{2}C(OH)OR, where R^{1}, R^{2} is a hydrogen atom or an organic substituent. They generally result from the nucleophilic addition of an alcohol (a compound with at least one hydroxy group) to an aldehyde (R−CH=O) or a ketone (R_{2}C=O) under acidic conditions. The addition of an alcohol to a ketone is more commonly referred to as a hemiketal. Common examples of hemiacetals include cyclic monosaccharides. Hemiacetals have use as a protecting group and in synthesizing oxygenated heterocycles like tetrahydrofurans.

== Nomenclature ==
According to the IUPAC definition of a hemiacetal, the R^{1} and R^{2} groups may or may not be hydrogen. In a hemiketal, both of these R-groups must not be hydrogen. Thus, hemiketals are regarded as a subclass of hemiacetals. The prefix hemi, meaning half, refers to the one alcohol added to the carbonyl group. This is half of the required alcohols to form acetals or ketals. Cyclic hemiacetals can sometimes be referred to as lactols.

== Formation ==
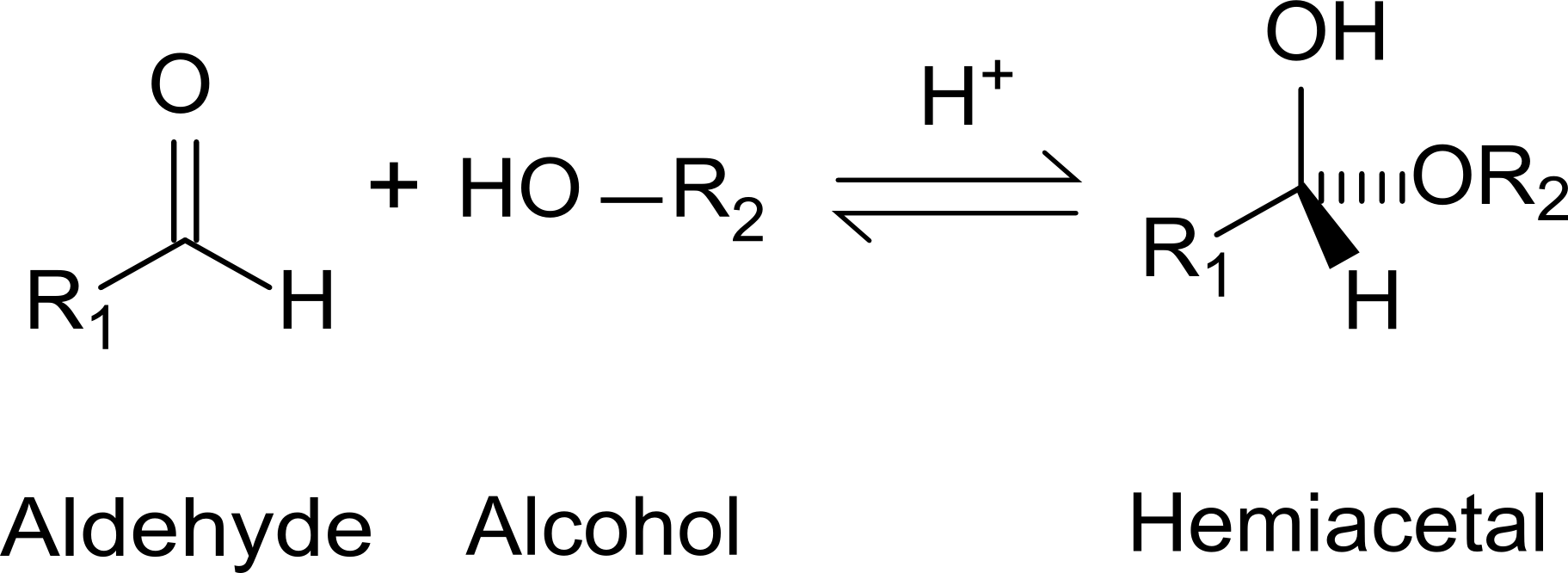
Formation of hemiacetals

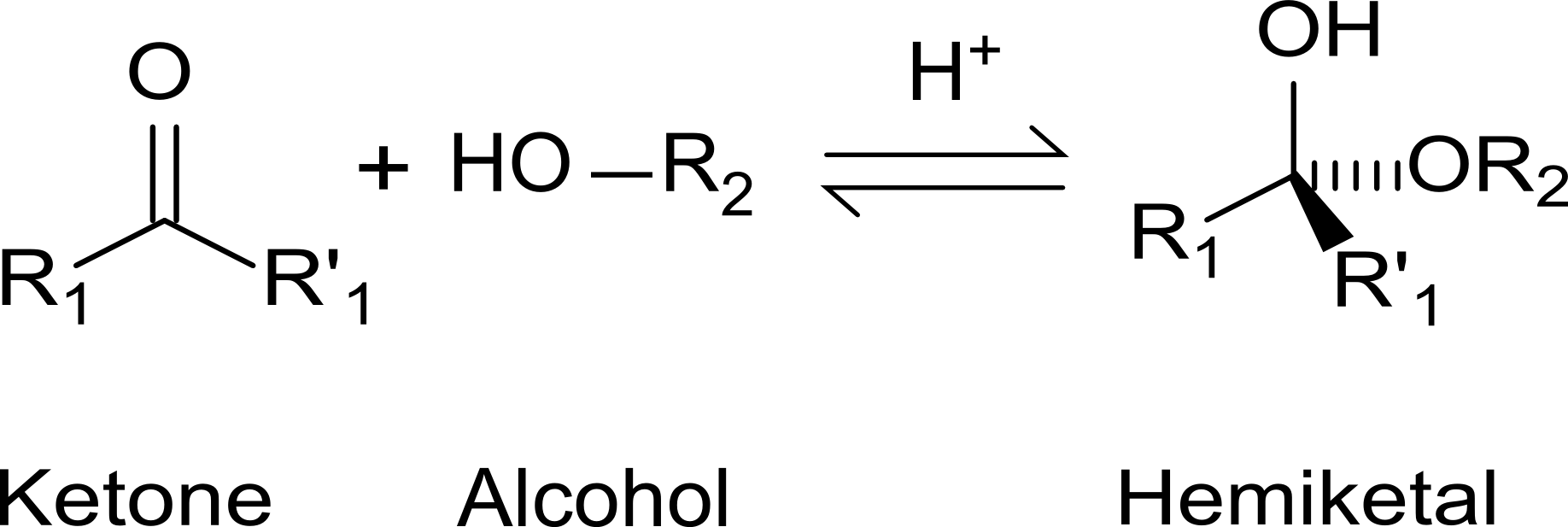
Formation of hemiketals

Hemiacetals form in the reaction between alcohols and aldehydes or ketones. Using an acid catalyst, the reaction proceeds via nucleophilic attack of the carbonyl group by the alcohol. A subsequent nucleophilic attack of the hemiacetal by the alcohol results in an acetal. Solutions of simple aldehydes in alcohols mainly consist of the hemiacetal. The equilibrium is dynamic and can be easily reversed via hydrolysis. The equilibrium is sensitive to steric effects.

Acetalization of aldehydes and ketones
Carbonyl compound	alcohol solvent	%hemiacetal
acetaldehyde	methanol	97
acetaldehyde	ethanol	91
propionaldehyde	methanol	95
bromoacetone	methanol	47

Cyclic hemiacetals often form readily, especially when they are 5- and 6-membered rings. In this case, a hydroxy group reacts with a carbonyl group within the same molecule to undergo an intramolecular cyclization reaction.

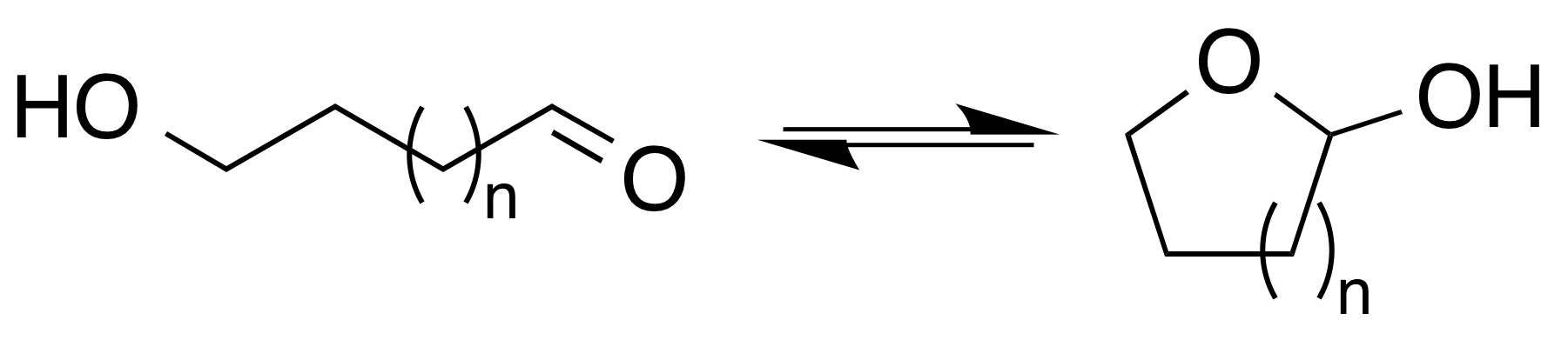
Formation of a general cyclic hemiacetal

Structures of some readily isolable hemiacetals and hemiketals. Chloral and ethyl glyoxalate illustrate the stabilizing influence of electron-withdrawing groups. The cyclopropanone case illustrates the effect of ring-strain. The two cases on the right illustrate the effect of ring-closure.

=== Hemiacetals in nature ===
Left: glucose, a cyclic hemiacetal.

Right: a lactol of fructose, a cyclic hemiketal.

Hemiacetals commonly exist in nature as aldoses such as glucose, and hemiketals commonly exist in nature as ketoses such as fructose. The favorability of the formation of a strain-free six-membered ring and the electrophilicity of an aldehyde combine to strongly favor the acetal form.

== Usage ==
Tetrahydrofurans can be synthesized from nucleophilic addition to hemiacetals with high stereoselectivity, which can be further used to form polymers such as lignans.

Hemiacetals can also undergo acid-catalyzed spirocyclization or metal-catalyzed addition/elimination to afford spiroacetals. These reactions are moderately stereoselective, although the thermodynamically-favoured isomer is often produced. Drug discovery programs synthesize spiroacetal scaffolds to generate libraries of spiroacetal-containing molecules. These spiroacetal derivatives have potential use in treating diseases such as CLL leukemia.

One method of producing linear hemiacetal esters is through the condensation of stabilized hemiacetals by anhydrides; this creates a stable hemiketal intermediate that subsequently undergoes acetylation into the hemiacetal ester. Hemiacetal esters are primarily used in polymer chemistry as a polymerization initiator and as a protecting group for carboxylic acids.
