= Fischer projection =

Method of representing 3D organic molecules as a 2D image

Fischer projection of D-Glyceraldehyde.

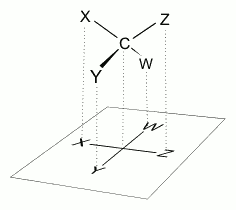
Projection of a tetrahedral molecule onto a planar surface.

Visualizing a Fischer projection.

In chemistry, the Fischer projection, devised by Emil Fischer in 1891, is a two-dimensional representation of a three-dimensional organic molecule by projection. Fischer projections were originally proposed for the depiction of carbohydrates, such as sugars, and used particularly in organic chemistry and biochemistry. The main purpose of Fischer projections is to visualize chiral molecules and distinguish between a pair of enantiomers. The use of Fischer projections in non-carbohydrates is discouraged, as such drawings are ambiguous and easily confused with other types of drawing.

== Conventions ==
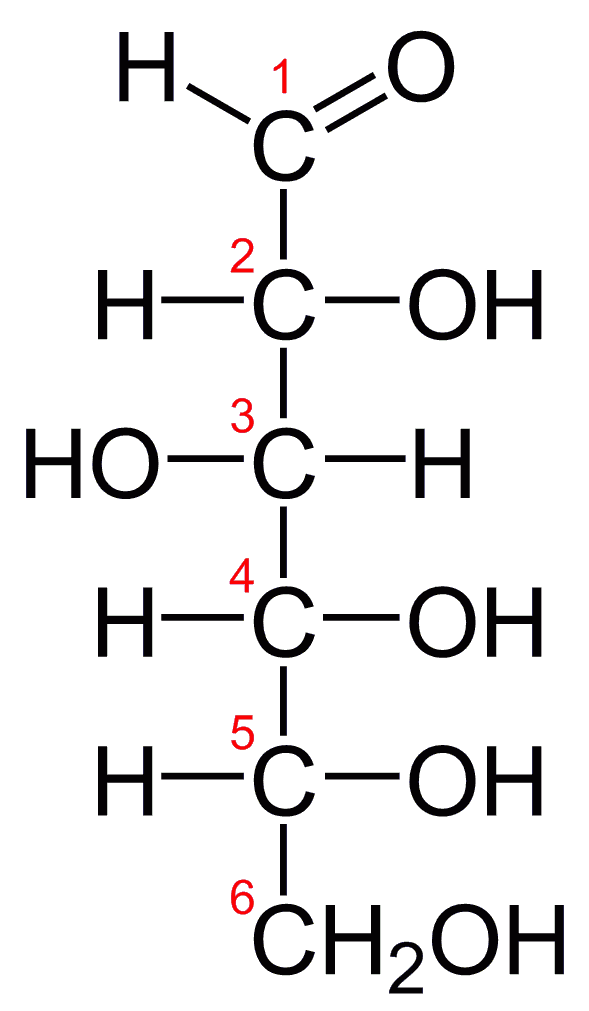
Fischer projection with carbon atoms

Fischer projection without carbon atoms

Natta projection

Three different projections of the same molecule (D-glucose)

All bonds are depicted as horizontal or vertical lines. The carbon chain is depicted vertically, with carbon atoms sometimes not shown as letters and represented by the center of crossing lines (see figure above). The orientation of the carbon chain is so that the first carbon (C1) is at the top. In an aldose, C1 is the carbon of the aldehyde group; in a ketose, C1 is the carbon closest to the ketone group, which is typically found at C2.

The proper way to view a Fischer projection is to vertically orient the molecule in relation to the carbon chain, have all horizontal bonds point toward the viewer, and orient all vertical bonds to point away from the viewer. Molecules with a simple tetrahedral geometry can be easily rotated in space so that this condition is met (see figures). Fischer projections are commonly constructed beginning with a sawhorse representation. To do so, all attachments to main chain carbons must be rotated such that resulting Newman projections show an eclipsed configuration. The carbon chain is then positioned vertically upward with all horizontal attachments pointing toward the viewer. Finally, attachments to main chain carbons that face away from the viewer are placed in the vertical position of the Fischer projection, and those that face toward the viewer are placed in the horizontal position of the Fischer projection. Each intersection between a horizontal and vertical line on the Fischer projection represents a carbon in the main carbon chain.

Fischer projections are effective representations of 3D molecular configuration in certain cases. For example, a monosaccharide with three carbon atoms (triose), such as the D-Glyceraldehyde depicted above, has a tetrahedral geometry, with C2 at its center, and can be rotated in space so that the carbon chain is vertical with C1 at the top, and the horizontal bonds connecting C2 with the Hydrogen and the Hydroxide are both slanted toward the viewer.

However, when creating a Fischer projection for a monosaccharide with more than three carbons, there is no way to orient the molecule in space so that all horizontal bonds will be slanted toward the viewer. After rotating the molecule so that both the horizontal bonds with C2 are slanted toward the viewer, the horizontal bonds with C3 will be typically slanted away. So, after drawing the bonds with C2, before drawing the bonds with C3 the molecule must be rotated in space by 180° about its vertical axis. Further similar rotations may be needed to complete the drawing.

This implies that in most cases a Fischer projection is not an accurate representation of the actual 3D configuration of a molecule. It can be regarded as a projection of a modified version of the molecule, ideally twisted at multiple levels along its backbone. For instance, an open-chain molecule of D-glucose rotated so that the horizontal bonds with C2 are slanted toward the viewer, would have the bonds with C3 and C5 slanted away from the viewer, and hence its accurate projection would not coincide with a Fischer projection. For a more accurate representation of an open-chain molecule, a Natta projection may be used.

According to IUPAC rules, all hydrogen atoms should preferably be drawn explicitly; in particular, the hydrogen atoms of the end group of carbohydrates should be present. In this regard Fischer projection is different from skeletal formulae.

== Chirality ==
Chiral molecules can be described as ones with a set of stereoisomers or left and right-handed enantiomers. As defined by Lord Kelvin, a molecule has chirality "if its image in a plane mirror, ideally realized, cannot be brought to coincide with itself." In other words, a chiral molecule is asymmetrical in the sense that its mirror image will not be an exact copy of itself. Chirality is key to understand in many fields such as drug development as one enantiomer of a drug may cause severe adverse effects while the other provides relief from an ailment. This is significant in terms of Fischer Projections as chirality is an important factor to consider when both drawing and reading them. A great benefit of the model is the ability to interpret chirality with ease based on the orientation of the substituents. Slight changes in the formatting of these models can cause the stereochemistry to be interpreted differently thereby meaning that the molecule has been depicted incorrectly. Fischer Projections provide aid in visualizing chirality as well as where substituents are oriented within space which is why their application can be useful to many.

=== Chirality from projection ===
Determining chirality based on Fischer Projections is effectively the same as the standard method. The primary difference is the benefit that Fischer Projections provide in depicting the orientation of substituents with the vertical and horizontal lines. Considering that orientation of these molecules is already known, it may be properly depicted with wedges and dashes if needed. After this, the priority of each of the groups bonded to the carbon are ranked and the chirality is determined in the standard fashion. While there is no significant difference in the actual process of determining chirality, Fischer Projections allow one to better visualize where substituents are in space making it convenient to assign S or R chirality based on this model. In certain cases, it can be helpful to draw a Fischer Projection from a larger molecule to visualize and determine the chirality of a specific carbon.

== Other models ==
Haworth projections are a related chemical notation used to represent sugars in ring form. The groups on the right hand side of a Fischer projection are equivalent to those below the plane of the ring in Haworth projections. Fischer projections should not be confused with Lewis structures, which do not contain any information about three dimensional geometry. Newman projections are another system that can be used as they showcase the structure of a molecule in the staggered or eclipsed conformation states. The wedge and dash notation will help to showcase the stereochemistry within a specific molecule.

== See also ==
- Structural formula
- Skeletal formula
- Haworth projection
- Newman projection
- Natta projection
