= Thiosilanes =

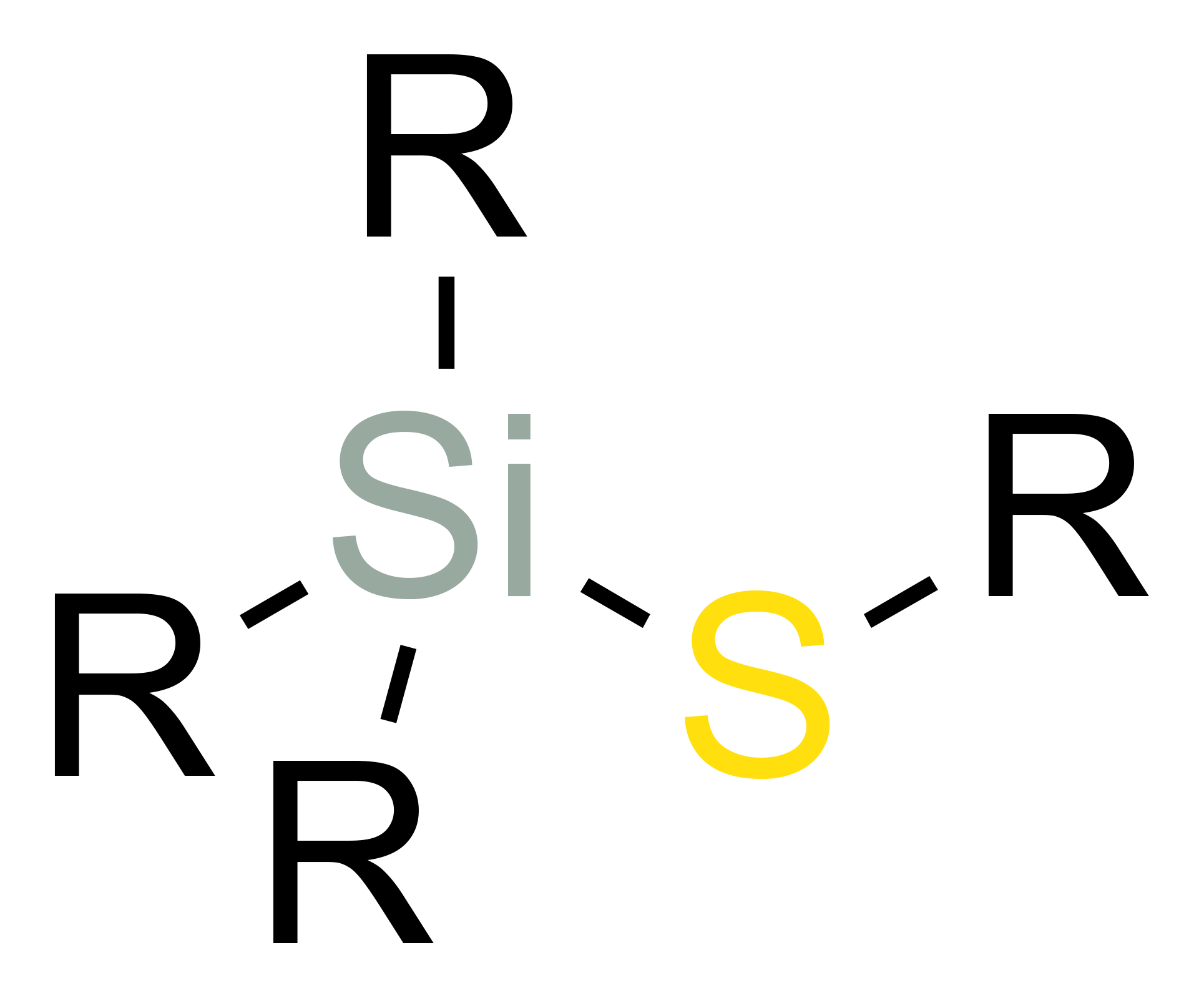
General structural formula of thiosilanes

As a family thiosilanes refers to compounds of the form RSSiR'H2 with a S-Si bond between organic groups.
