= C-glycosyl tryptophan =

Chemical compound

C-glycosyltryptophan is an indolyl carboxylic amino acid with the structural formula C_{17}H_{22}N_{2}O_{7}. This sugar-loaded amino acid strongly correlates with age.
