= Newman projection =

Method of representing the conformation of a single molecular bond

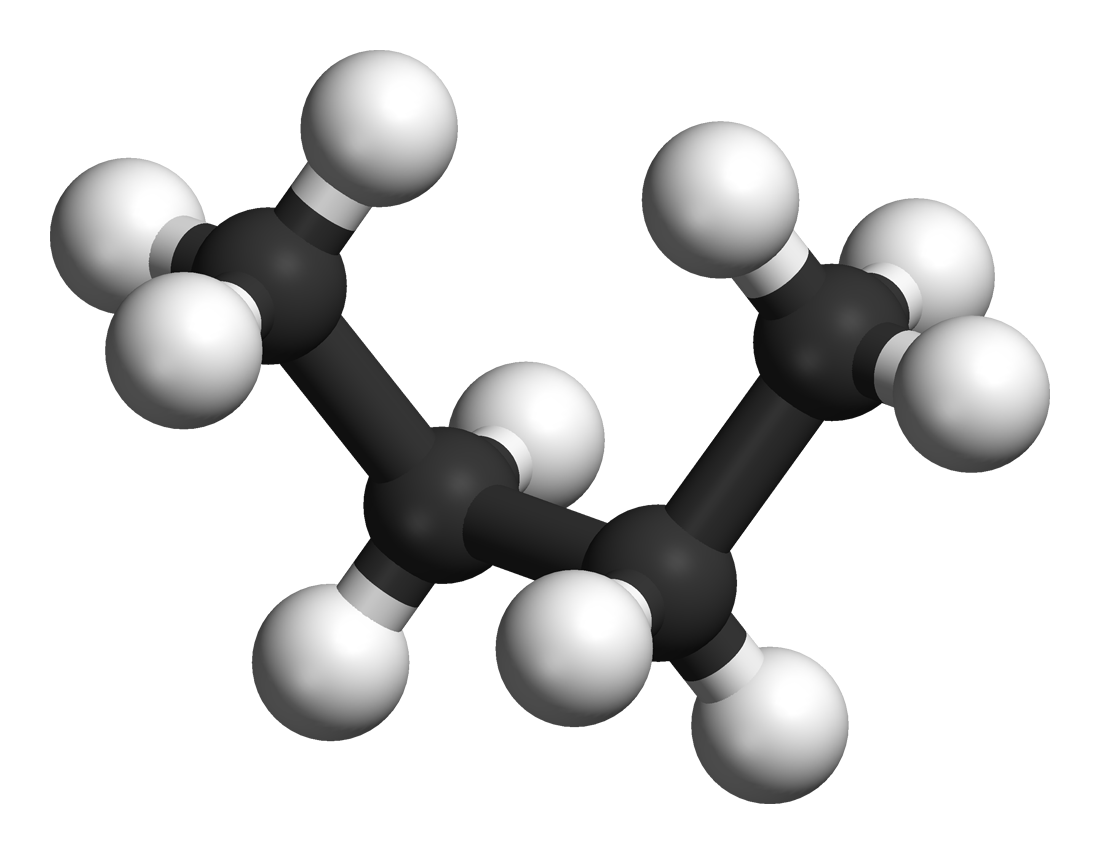
Molecule of butane in syn-clinal (-sc) conformation
| Sawhorse projection | Newman projection | 3D structure |

A Newman projection is a drawing that helps visualize the 3-dimensional structure of a molecule. This projection most commonly sights down a carbon-carbon bond, making it a very useful way to visualize the stereochemistry of alkanes. A Newman projection visualizes the conformation of a chemical bond from front to back, with the front atom represented by the intersection of three lines (a dot) and the back atom as a circle. The front atom is called proximal, while the back atom is called distal. This type of representation clearly illustrates the specific dihedral angle between the proximal and distal atoms.

This projection is named after American chemist Melvin Spencer Newman, who introduced it in 1952 as a partial replacement for Fischer projections, which are unable to represent conformations and thus conformers properly. This diagram style is an alternative to a sawhorse projection, which views a carbon–carbon bond from an oblique angle, or a wedge-and-dash style, such as a Natta projection. These other styles can indicate the bonding and stereochemistry, but not as much conformational detail.

A Newman projection can also be used to study cyclic molecules, such as the chair conformation of cyclohexane:

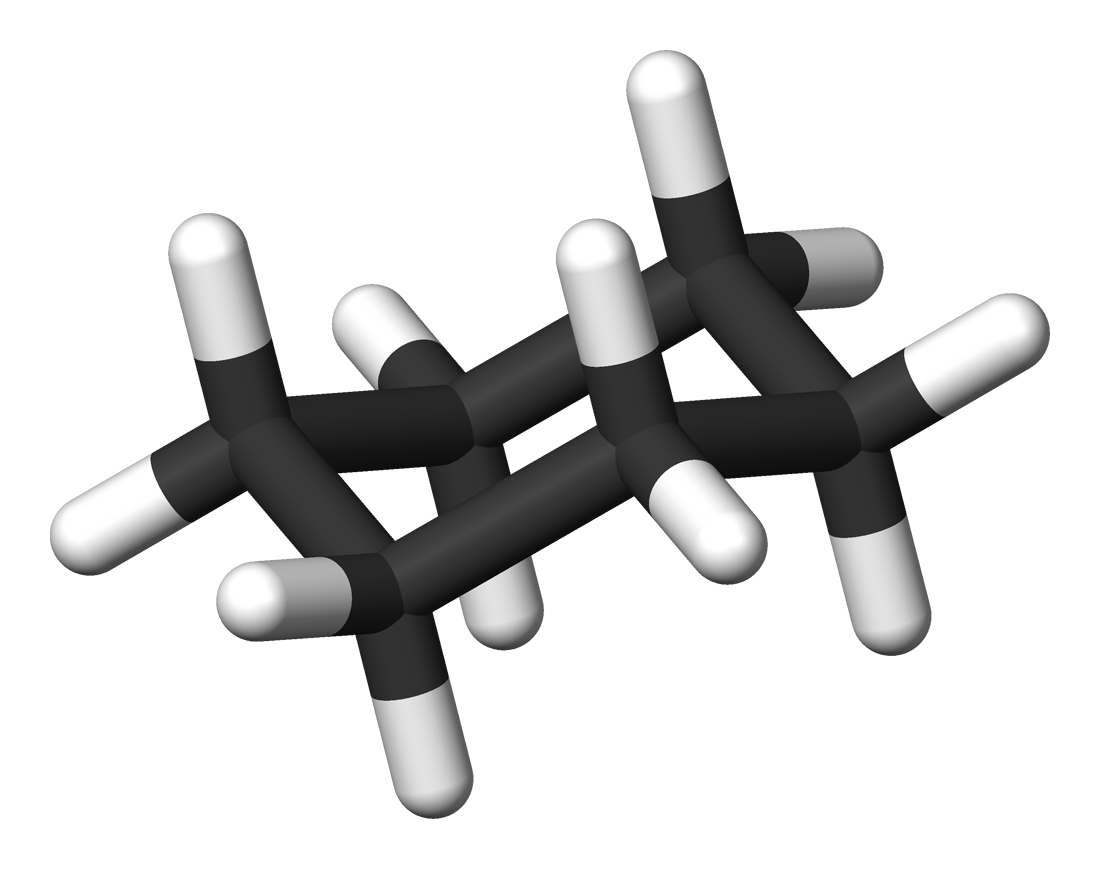
| Bond-line structure | Newman projection | 3D structure |

Because of the free rotation around single bonds, there are various conformations for a single molecule. Up to six unique conformations may be drawn for any given chemical bond. Each conformation is drawn by rotation of either the proximal or distal atom 60 degrees. Of these six conformations, three will be in a staggered conformation, while the other three will be in an eclipsed conformation. These six conformations can be represented in a relative energy diagram.

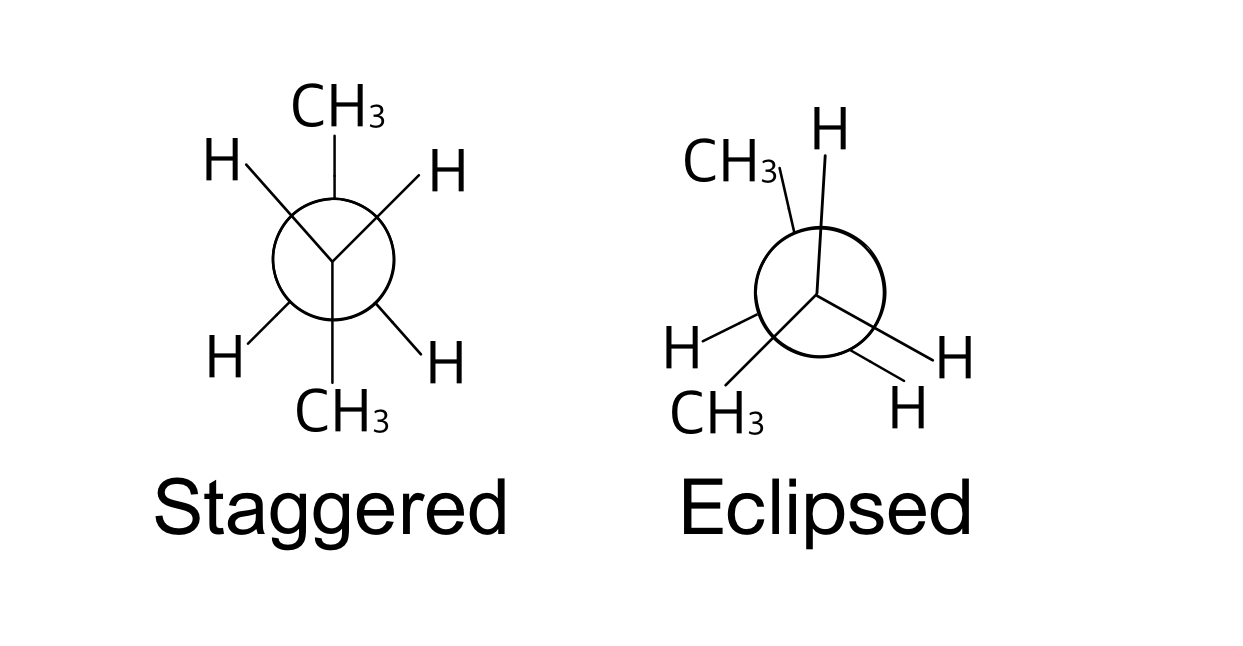
Butane molecule represented on a staggered and eclipsed Newman projection down a carbon-carbon bond

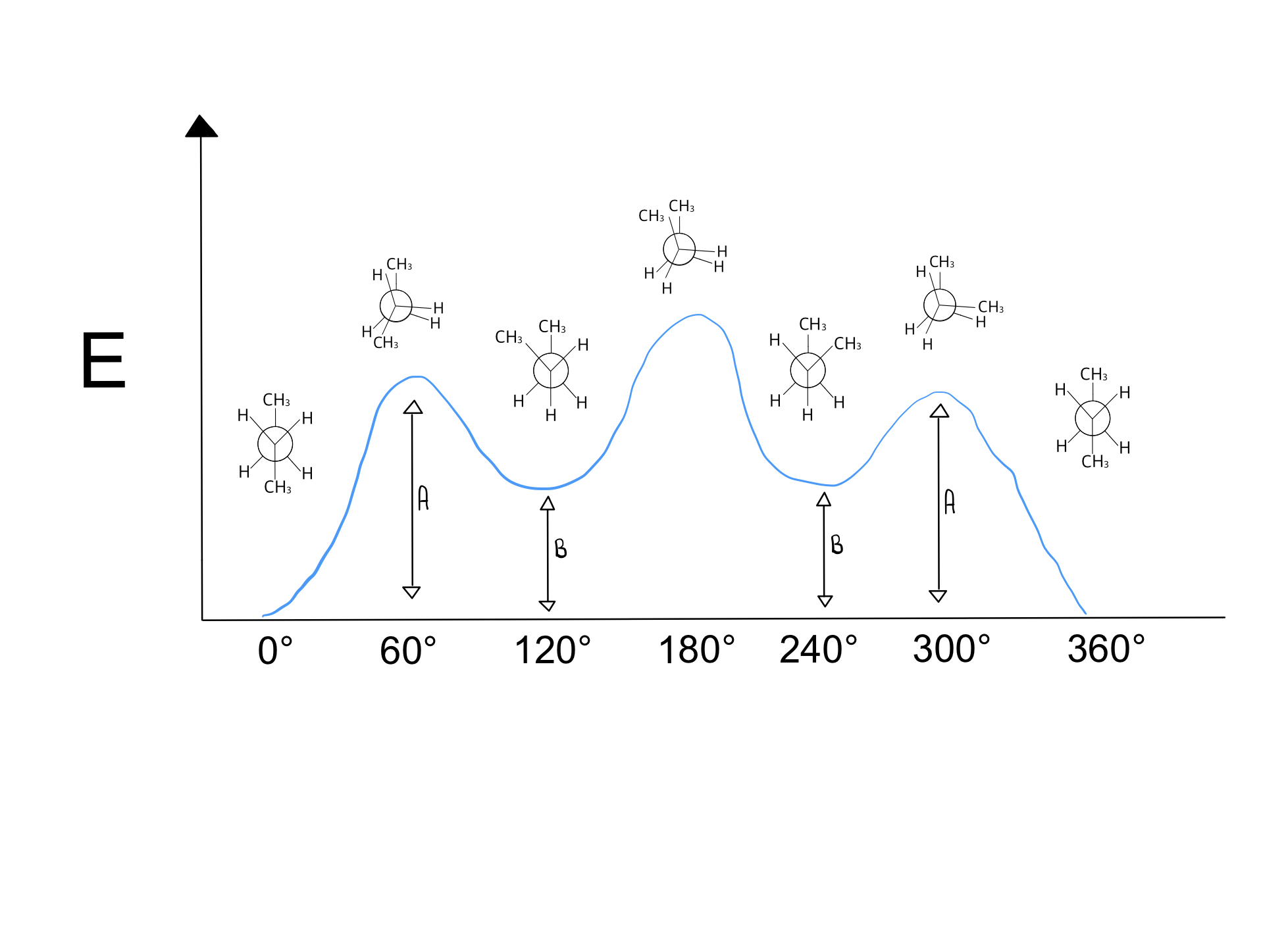
Butane molecule and all of its possible Newman conformations represented on a relative energy diagram. The diagram takes staggered and eclipsed conformations, as well as gauche and anti interactions into account.

A staggered projection appears to have the surrounding species equidistant from each other. This kind of conformation tends to experience both anti and gauche interactions. Anti interactions refer to the molecules (usually of the same type) sitting exactly opposite of each other at 180° on the Newman projection. Gauche interactions refer to molecules (also usually of the same type) being 60° from each other on a Newman projection. Anti interactions experience less steric strain than gauche interactions, but both experience less steric strain than the eclipsed conformation.

An eclipsed projection appears to have the surrounding species almost on top of each other. In reality, these species are in line with each other, but are drawn slightly staggered to help format the projection onto paper. These types of conformations are generally higher in energy due to increased bond strain. However, this strain can be somewhat lower if a hydrogen is eclipsed over a larger species, as opposed to two large species eclipsed over each other.

== See also ==
- Haworth projection
- Fischer projection
- Natta projection
