= Valency interaction formula =

The Valency Interaction Formula, or VIF provides a way of drawing or interpreting the molecular structural formula based on molecular orbital theory. Valency Points, VP, dots drawn on a page, represent valence orbitals. Valency Interactions, VI, that connect the dots, show interactions between these valence orbitals. Theory was developed by Turkish quantum chemist Oktay Sinanoğlu in the early 1980s and first published in 1983. The theory was like a new language of quantum mechanics by the exact definition of Hilbert space. It was also the solution of the problem that Paul Dirac was trying to solve at the time of his death in 1984, which concerned the hidden symmetries in Hilbert space which were responsible for the accidental degeneracies not arising from a spatial symmetry, that was about the higher symmetries of Hilbert space) Sinanoğlu showed that the solution was possible only when the topology tool was used. This VIF theory also connected both delocalized and localized molecular orbital schemes into a unified form in an elegant way.

Chemical deductions are made from a VIF picture with the application of two pictorial rules. These are linear transformations applied to the VIF structural formula as a quantum operator. Transformation by the two rules preserves invariants crucial to the characterization of the molecular electronic properties, the numbers of bonding, non-bonding, and anti-bonding orbitals and/or the numbers of doubly, singly, and unoccupied valence orbitals. The two pictorial rules relate all pictures with the same electronic properties as characterized by these invariants.

A thorough presentation of VIF is available through the open access journal symmetry.

== See also ==
- Structural Formula
- Lewis Structure
- Valence Bond Theory
