= Haworth projection =

Method for writing structural formulas of monosaccharide molecules

Haworth projection of the structures for α-D-glucopyranose and α-L-glucopyranose

In chemistry, a Haworth projection is a common way of writing a structural formula to represent the cyclic structure of monosaccharides and polysaccharides with a simple three-dimensional perspective. A Haworth projection approximates the shapes of the actual molecules better for furanoses—which are in reality nearly planar—than for pyranoses that exist in solution in the chair conformation. Organic chemistry and especially biochemistry are the areas of chemistry that use the Haworth projection the most.

The Haworth projection was named after the British chemist Sir Norman Haworth.

A Haworth projection has the following characteristics:

- Carbon is the implicit type of atom. In the example on the right, the atoms numbered from 1 to 6 are all carbon atoms. Carbon 1 is known as the anomeric carbon.
- Hydrogen atoms on carbon are implicit. In the example, atoms 1 to 6 have extra hydrogen atoms not depicted.
- A thicker line indicates atoms that are closer to the observer. In the example on the right, atoms 2 and 3 (and their corresponding OH groups) are the closest to the observer. Atoms 1 and 4 are further from the observer. Atom 5 and the other atoms are the furthest.
- The groups below the plane of the ring in Haworth projections correspond to those on the right-hand side of a Fischer projection. This rule does not apply to the groups on the two ring carbons bonded to the endocyclic oxygen atom combined with hydrogen.

== See also ==
- Skeletal formula
- Fischer projection
- Natta projection
- Newman projection
