= Natta projection =

Method of representing molecular structure in two dimensions

In chemistry, the Natta projection (named for Italian chemist Giulio Natta) is a way to depict molecules with complete stereochemistry in two dimensions in a skeletal formula. In a hydrocarbon molecule with all carbon atoms making up the backbone in a tetrahedral molecular geometry, the zigzag backbone is in the paper plane (chemical bonds depicted as solid line segments) with the substituents either sticking out of the paper toward the viewer (chemical bonds depicted as solid wedges) or away from the viewer (chemical bonds depicted as dashed wedges). The Natta projection is useful for representing the tacticity of a polymer.

isotactic polymers

== See also ==
- Structural formula
- Wedge-and-dash notation in skeletal formulas
- Haworth projection
- Newman projection
- Fischer projection
