= Structural formula =

Graphic representation of a molecular structure

Skeletal structural formula of Vitamin B_{12}. Many organic molecules are too complicated to be specified by a molecular formula.

The structural formula of a chemical compound is a graphic representation of the molecular structure (determined by structural chemistry methods), showing how the atoms are connected to one another. The chemical bonding within the molecule is also shown, either explicitly or implicitly. Unlike other chemical formula types, (Note: Structural formula is a type of chemical formula.) which have a limited number of symbols and are capable of only limited descriptive power, structural formulas provide a more complete geometric representation of the molecular structure. For example, many chemical compounds exist in different isomeric forms, which have different enantiomeric structures but the same molecular formula. There are multiple types of ways to draw these structural formulas such as: Lewis structures, condensed formulas, skeletal formulas, Newman projections, Cyclohexane conformations, Haworth projections, and Fischer projections.

Several systematic chemical naming formats, as in chemical databases, are used that are equivalent to, and as powerful as, geometric structures. These chemical nomenclature systems include SMILES, InChI and CML. These systematic chemical names can be converted to structural formulas and vice versa, but chemists nearly always describe a chemical reaction or synthesis using structural formulas rather than chemical names, because the structural formulas allow the chemist to visualize the molecules and the structural changes that occur in them during chemical reactions. ChemSketch and ChemDraw are popular downloads/websites that allow users to draw reactions and structural formulas, typically in the Lewis Structure style.

== Structures in structural formulas ==
=== Bonds ===
Bonds are often shown as a line that connects one atom to another. One line indicates a single bond. Two lines indicate a double bond, and three lines indicate a triple bond. In some structures the atoms in between each bond are specified and shown. However, in some structures, the carbon molecules are not written out specifically. Instead, these carbons are indicated by a corner that forms when two lines connect. Additionally, Hydrogen atoms are implied and not usually drawn out. These can be inferred based on how many other atoms the carbon is attached to. For example, if Carbon A is attached to one other Carbon B, Carbon A will have three hydrogens in order to fill its octet.

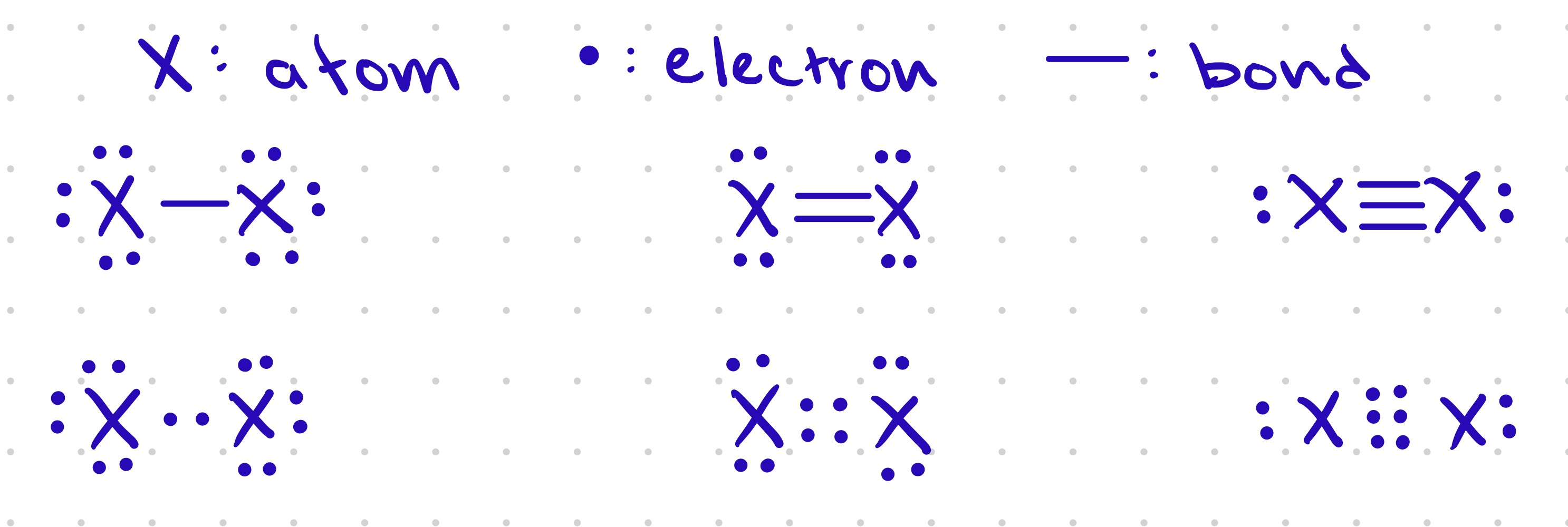
This shows the bonds in relation to the electrons being shared.

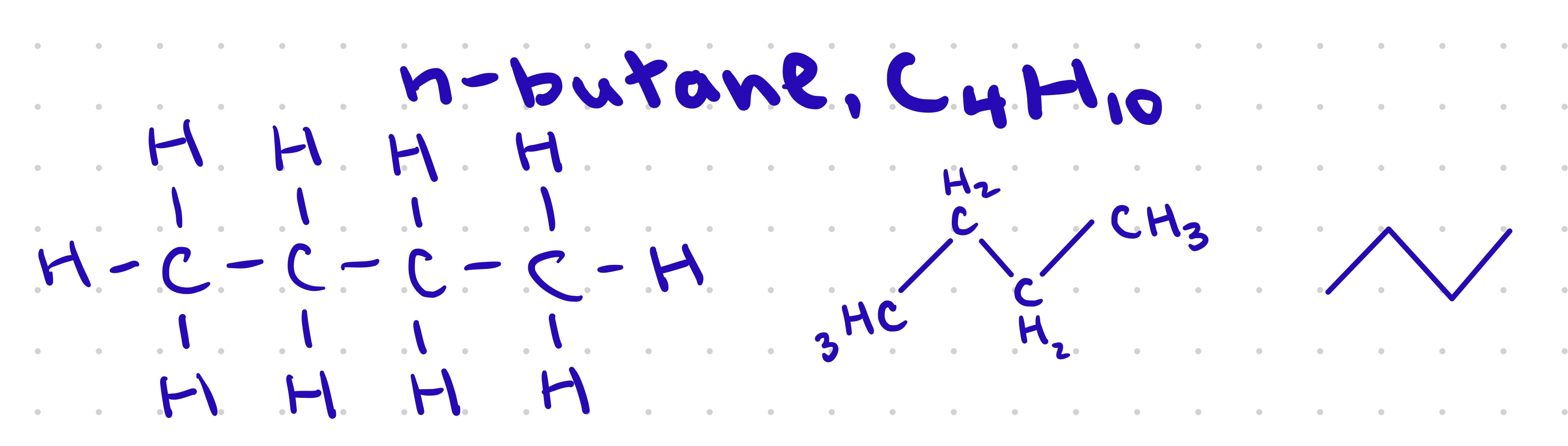
This shows how bonds are depicted to connect to other atoms in the various structural formulas used.

=== Electrons ===
Charges on atoms and their formation

Electrons are usually shown as colored-in circles. One circle indicates one electron. Two circles indicate a pair of electrons. Typically, a pair of electrons will also indicate a negative charge. By using the colored circles, the number of electrons in the valence shell of each respective atom is indicated, providing further descriptive information regarding the reactive capacity of that atom in the molecule.

=== Charges ===
Oftentimes, atoms will have a positive or negative charge as their octet may not be complete. If the atom is missing a pair of electrons or has a proton, it will have a positive charge. If the atom has electrons that are not bonded to another atom, there will be a negative charge. In structural formulas, the positive charge is indicated by ⊕, and the negative charge is indicated by ⊖ .

This image shows the wedges in the structural formula and how they indicate the stereochemistry of the compound.

=== Stereochemistry (Skeletal formula) ===
Skeletal formula of strychnine. A solid wedged bond seen for example at the nitrogen (N) at top indicates a bond pointing above-the-plane, while a dashed wedged bond seen for example at the hydrogen (H) at bottom indicates a below-the-plane bond.

Chirality in skeletal formulas is indicated by the Natta projection method. Stereochemistry is used to show the relative spatial arrangement of atoms in a molecule. Wedges are used to show this, and there are two types: dashed and filled. A filled wedge indicates that the atom is in the front of the molecule; it is pointing above the plane of the paper towards the front. A dashed wedge indicates that the atom is behind the molecule; it is pointing below the plane of the paper. When a straight, un-dashed line is used, the atom is in the plane of the paper. This spatial arrangement provides an idea of the molecule in a 3-dimensional space and there are constraints as to how the spatial arrangements can be arranged.

=== Unspecified stereochemistry ===
Fructose, with a bond at the hydroxyl (OH) group upper left of image with unknown or unspecified stereochemistry

Wavy single bonds represent unknown or unspecified stereochemistry or a mixture of isomers. For example, the adjacent diagram shows the fructose molecule with a wavy bond to the HOCH_{2}− group at the left. In this case the two possible ring structures are in chemical equilibrium with each other and also with the open-chain structure. The ring automatically opens and closes, sometimes closing with one stereochemistry and sometimes with the other.

Skeletal formulas can depict cis and trans isomers of alkenes. Wavy single bonds are the standard way to represent unknown or unspecified stereochemistry or a mixture of isomers (as with tetrahedral stereocenters). A crossed double-bond has been used sometimes, but is no longer considered an acceptable style for general use.

Alkene stereochemistry

== Lewis structures ==
Lewis structures for ammonia (NH_{3}). Each electron pair is shown as a dot pair (left), or equivalently, bonding electron pairs are shown as a bond line (right).

Lewis structures (or "Lewis dot structures") are flat graphical formulas that show atom connectivity and lone pair or unpaired electrons, but not three-dimensional structure. This notation is mostly used for small molecules. Each line represents the two electrons of a single bond. Two or three parallel lines between pairs of atoms represent double or triple bonds, respectively. Alternatively, pairs of dots may be used to represent bonding pairs. In addition, all non-bonded electrons (paired or unpaired) and any formal charges on atoms are indicated. Through the use of Lewis structures, the placement of electrons, whether it is in a bond or in lone pairs, will allow for the identification of the formal charges of the atoms in the molecule to understand the stability and determine the most likely molecule (based on molecular geometry difference) that would be formed in a reaction. Lewis structures do give some thought to the geometry of the molecule as oftentimes, the bonds are drawn at certain angles to represent the molecule in real life. Lewis structure is best used to calculate formal charges or how atoms bond to each other as both electrons and bonds are shown. Lewis structures give an idea of the molecular and electronic geometry which varies based on the presence of bonds and lone pairs and through this one could determine the bond angles and hybridization as well.

== Condensed formulas ==
In early organic-chemistry publications, where use of graphics was strongly limited, a typographic system arose to describe organic structures in a line of text. Although this system tends to be problematic in application to cyclic compounds, it remains a convenient way to represent simple structures:

CH_{3}CH_{2}OH (ethanol)

Parentheses are used to indicate multiple identical groups, indicating attachment to the nearest non-hydrogen atom on the left when appearing within a formula, or to the atom on the right when appearing at the start of a formula:

(CH_{3})_{2}CHOH or CH(CH_{3})_{2}OH (2-propanol)

In all cases, all atoms are shown, including hydrogen atoms. It is also helpful to show the carbonyls where the C=O is implied through the O being placed in the parentheses. For example:

CH_{3}C(O)CH_{3} (acetone)

Therefore, it is important to look to the left of the atom in the parentheses to make sure what atom it is attached to. This is helpful when converting from condensed formula to another form of structural formula such as skeletal formula or Lewis structures. There are different ways to show the various functional groups in the condensed formulas such as aldehyde as CHO, carboxylic acids as CO_{2}H or COOH, esters as CO_{2}R or COOR. However, the use of condensed formulas does not give an immediate idea of the molecular geometry of the compound or the number of bonds between the carbons, it needs to be recognized based on the number of atoms attached to the carbons and if there are any charges on the carbon.

== Skeletal formulas ==
Skeletal formulas are the standard notation for more complex organic molecules. In this type of diagram, first used by the organic chemist Friedrich August Kekulé von Stradonitz, the carbon atoms are implied to be located at the vertices (corners) and ends of line segments rather than being indicated with the atomic symbol C. Hydrogen atoms attached to carbon atoms are not indicated: each carbon atom is understood to be associated with enough hydrogen atoms to give the carbon atom four bonds. The presence of a positive or negative charge at a carbon atom takes the place of one of the implied hydrogen atoms. Hydrogen atoms attached to atoms other than carbon must be written explicitly. An additional feature of skeletal formulas is that by adding certain structures the stereochemistry, that is the three-dimensional structure, of the compound can be determined. Often times, the skeletal formula can indicate stereochemistry through the use of wedges instead of lines. Solid wedges represent bonds pointing above the plane of the paper, whereas dashed wedges represent bonds pointing below the plane.

Skeletal formula of isobutanol, (CH_{3})_{2}CHCH_{2}OH

== Perspective drawings ==
=== Newman projection and sawhorse projection ===
The Newman projection and the sawhorse projection are used to depict specific conformers or to distinguish vicinal stereochemistry. In both cases, two specific carbon atoms and their connecting bond are the center of attention. The only difference is a slightly different perspective: the Newman projection looking straight down the bond of interest, the sawhorse projection looking at the same bond but from a somewhat oblique vantage point. In the Newman projection, a circle is used to represent a plane perpendicular to the bond, distinguishing the substituents on the front carbon from the substituents on the back carbon. In the sawhorse projection, the front carbon is usually on the left and is always slightly lower. Sometimes, an arrow is used to indicate the front carbon. The sawhorse projection is very similar to a skeletal formula, and it can even use wedges instead of lines to indicate the stereochemistry of the molecule. The sawhorse projection is set apart from the skeletal formulas because the sawhorse projection is not a very good indicator of molecule geometry and molecular arrangement. Both a Newman and Sawhorse Projection can be used to create a Fischer Projection.

Newman projection of butane

Sawhorse projection of butane

=== Cyclohexane conformations ===
Certain conformations of cyclohexane and other small-ring compounds can be shown using a standard convention. For example, the standard chair conformation of cyclohexane involves a perspective view from slightly above the average plane of the carbon atoms and indicates clearly which groups are axial (pointing vertically up or down) and which are equatorial (almost horizontal, slightly slanted up or down). Bonds in front may or may not be highlighted with stronger lines or wedges. The conformations progress as follows: chair to half-chair to twist-boat to boat to twist-boat to half-chair to chair. The cyclohexane conformations may also be used to show the potential energy present at each stage as shown in the diagram. The chair conformations (A) have the lowest energy, whereas the half-chair conformations (D) have the highest energy. There is a peak/local maximum at the boat conformation (C), and there are valleys/local minimums at the twist-boat conformations (B). In addition, cyclohexane conformations can be used to indicate if the molecule has any 1,3 diaxial-interactions which are steric interactions between axial substituents on the 1,3, and 5 carbons.

Chair conformation of beta-D-Glucose

The cyclohexane conformations in relation to the potential energy at each conformation

=== Haworth projection ===
The Haworth projection is used for cyclic sugars. Axial and equatorial positions are not distinguished; instead, substituents are positioned directly above or below the ring atom to which they are connected. Hydrogen substituents are typically omitted.

However, an important thing to keep in mind while reading an Haworth projection is that the ring structures are not flat. Therefore, Haworth does not provide 3-D shape. Sir Norman Haworth, was a British Chemist, who won a Nobel Prize for his work on Carbohydrates and discovering the structure of Vitamin C. During his discovery, he also deducted different structural formulas which are now referred to as Haworth Projections. In a Haworth Projection a pyranose sugar is depicted as a hexagon and a furanose sugar is depicted as a pentagon. Usually an oxygen is placed at the upper right corner in pyranose and in the upper center in a furanose sugar. The thinner bonds at the top of the ring refer to the bonds as being farther away and the thicker bonds at the bottom of the ring refer to the end of the ring that is closer to the viewer.

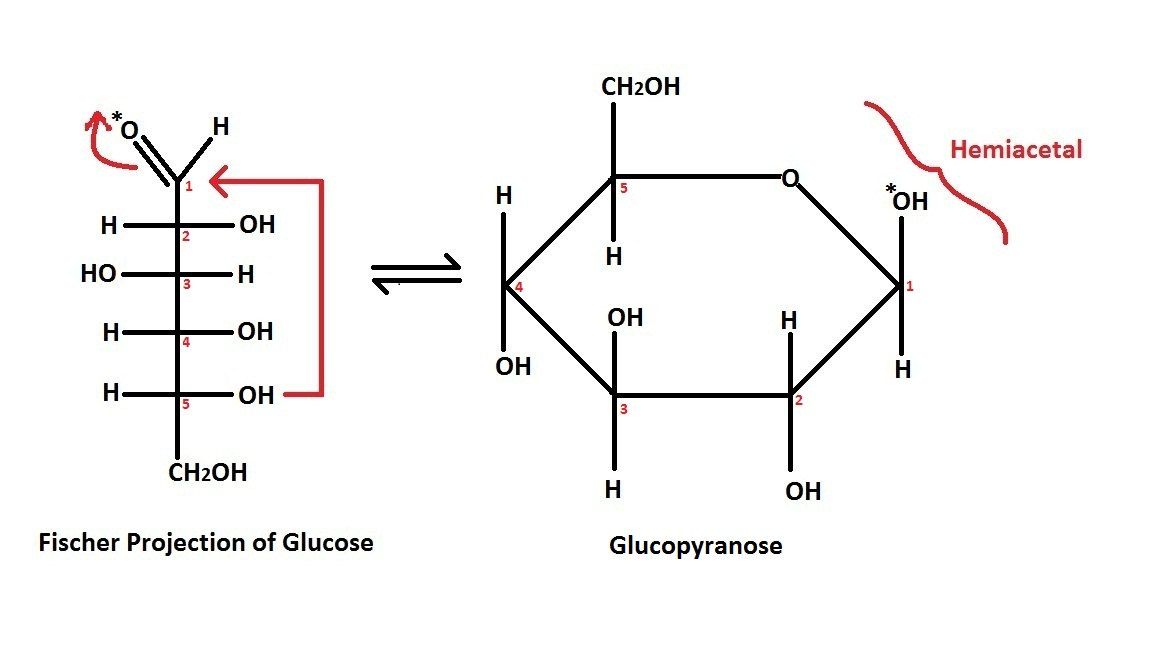
Fischer and Haworth projection of Glucopyranose

Haworth projection of beta-D-Glucose

=== Fischer projection ===
The Fischer projection is mostly used for linear monosaccharides. At any given carbon center, vertical bond lines are equivalent to stereochemical hashed markings, directed away from the observer, while horizontal lines are equivalent to wedges, pointing toward the observer. The projection is unrealistic, as a saccharide would never adopt this multiply eclipsed conformation. Nonetheless, the Fischer projection is a simple way of depicting multiple sequential stereocenters that does not require or imply any knowledge of actual conformation. A Fischer projection will restrict a 3-D molecule to 2-D, and therefore, there are limitations to changing the configuration of the chiral centers. Fischer projections are used to determine the R and S configuration on a chiral carbon and it is done using the Cahn Ingold Prelog rules. It is a convenient way to represent and distinguish between enantiomers and diastereomers.

Fischer projection of D-Glucose

== Limitations ==
A structural formula is a simplified model that cannot represent certain aspects of chemical structures. For example, formalized bonding may not be applicable to dynamic systems such as delocalized bonds. Aromaticity is such a case and relies on convention to represent the bonding. Different styles of structural formulas may represent aromaticity in different ways, leading to different depictions of the same chemical compound. Another example is formal double bonds where the electron density is spread outside the formal bond, leading to partial double bond character and slow inter-conversion at room temperature. For all dynamic effects, temperature will affect the inter-conversion rates and may change how the structure should be represented. There is no explicit temperature associated with a structural formula, although many assume that it would be standard temperature.

== See also ==
- Molecular graph
- Chemical formula
- Valency interaction formula
- Side chain
- Chemical structure
