= Staggered conformation =

Molecular form in which substituents on two adjacent atoms are furthest apart

Staggered conformation image right in Newman projection

Eclipsed conformation

In organic chemistry, a staggered conformation is a chemical conformation of an ethane-like moiety abcX–Ydef in which the substituents a, b, and c are at the maximum distance from d, e, and f; this requires the torsion angles to be 60°. It is the opposite of an eclipsed conformation, in which those substituents are as close to each other as possible.

Such a conformation exists in any open chain single chemical bond connecting two sp^{3}-hybridised atoms, and is normally a conformational energy minimum. For some molecules such as those of n-butane, there can be special versions of staggered conformations called gauche and anti; see first Newman projection diagram in conformational isomerism.

Staggered/eclipsed configurations also distinguish different crystalline structures of e.g. cubic/hexagonal boron nitride, and diamond/lonsdaleite.

== See also ==
- Alkane stereochemistry
- Eclipsed conformation
