= Eclipsed conformation =

Molecular form in which substituents on two adjacent atoms are closest together

Eclipsed conformation (image right in Newman projection)

Staggered conformation

In chemistry an eclipsed conformation is a conformation in which two substituents X and Y on adjacent atoms A, B are in closest proximity, implying that the torsion angle X–A–B–Y is 0°. Such a conformation can exist in any open chain, single chemical bond connecting two sp^{3}-hybridised atoms, and it is normally a conformational energy maximum. This maximum is often explained by steric hindrance, but its origins sometimes actually lie in hyperconjugation (as when the eclipsing interaction is of two hydrogen atoms).

In the example of ethane, two methyl groups are connected with a carbon-carbon sigma bond, just as one might connect two Lego pieces through a single "stud" and "tube". With this image in mind, if the methyl groups are rotated around the bond, they will remain connected; however, the shape will change. This leads to multiple possible three-dimensional arrangements, known as conformations, conformational isomers (conformers), or sometimes rotational isomers (rotamers).

== Organic chemistry ==
Conformations can be described by dihedral angles, which are used to determine the placements of atoms and their distance from one another and can be visualized by Newman projections. A dihedral angle can indicate staggered and eclipsed orientation, but is specifically used to determine the angle between two specific atoms on opposing carbons. Different conformations have unequal energies, creating an energy barrier to bond rotation which is known as torsional strain. In particular, eclipsed conformations tend to have raised energies due to the repulsion of the electron clouds of the eclipsed substituents.

Relative energy of conformations of ethane

The relative energies of different conformations can be visualized using graphs. In the example of ethane, such a graph shows that rotation around the carbon-carbon bond is not entirely free but that an energy barrier exists. The ethane molecule in the eclipsed conformation is said to suffer from torsional strain, and by a rotation around the carbon carbon bond to the staggered conformation around 12.5 kJ/mol of torsional energy is released.

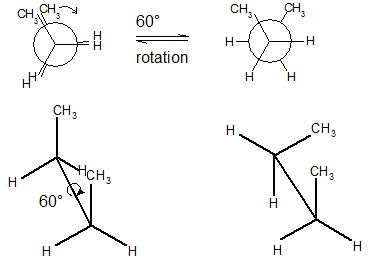
Rotation of the C2-C3 single bond in butane

In the case of butane and its four-carbon chain, three carbon-carbon bonds are available to rotate. The example below is looking down the C2 and C3 bond. Below is the sawhorse and Newman representation of butane in an eclipsed conformation with the two CH_{3} groups (C1 and C4) at a 0-degree angle from one another (left).

If the front is rotated 60° clockwise, the butane molecule is now in a staggered conformation (right). This conformation is more specifically referred to as the gauche conformation of butane. This is due to the fact that the methyl groups are staggered, but only 60° from one another. This conformation is more energetically favored than the eclipsed conformation, but it is not the most energetically favorable conformation. Another 60° rotation gives us a second eclipsed conformation where both methyl groups are aligned with hydrogen atoms. One more 60 rotation produces another staggered conformation referred to as the anti conformation. This occurs when the methyl groups are positioned opposite (180°) of one another. This is the most energetically favorable conformation.

The minima can be seen on the graph at 60, 180 and 300 degrees while the maxima can be seen at 0, 120, 240, and 360 degrees. The maxima represent the eclipsed conformations due to the dihedral angle of zero degrees.

== Structural applications ==
As established by X-ray crystallography, octachlorodimolybdate(II) anion ([Mo_{2}Cl_{8}]^{4-}) has an eclipsed conformation. This sterically unfavorable geometry is given as evidence for a quadruple bond between the Mo centers.

Experiments such as X-ray and electron diffraction analyses, nuclear magnetic resonance, microwave spectroscopies, and more have allowed researchers to determine which cycloalkane structures are the most stable based on the different possible conformations. Another method that was shown successful is molecular mechanics, a computational method that allows the total strain energies of different conformations to be found and analyzed. It was found that the most stable conformations had lower energies based on values of energy due to bond distances and bond angles.

In many cases, isomers of alkanes with branched chains have lower boiling points than those that are unbranched, which has been shown through experimentation with isomers of C_{8}H_{18}. This is because of a combination of intermolecular forces and size that results from the branched chains. The more branches that an alkane has, the more extended its shape is; meanwhile, if it is less branched then it will have more intermolecular attractive forces that will need to be broken which is the cause of the increased boiling point for unbranched alkanes. In another case, 2,2,3,3-tetramethylbutane is shaped more like an ellipsoid causing it to be able to form a crystal lattice which raises the melting point of the molecule because it will take more energy to transition from a solid to a liquid state.

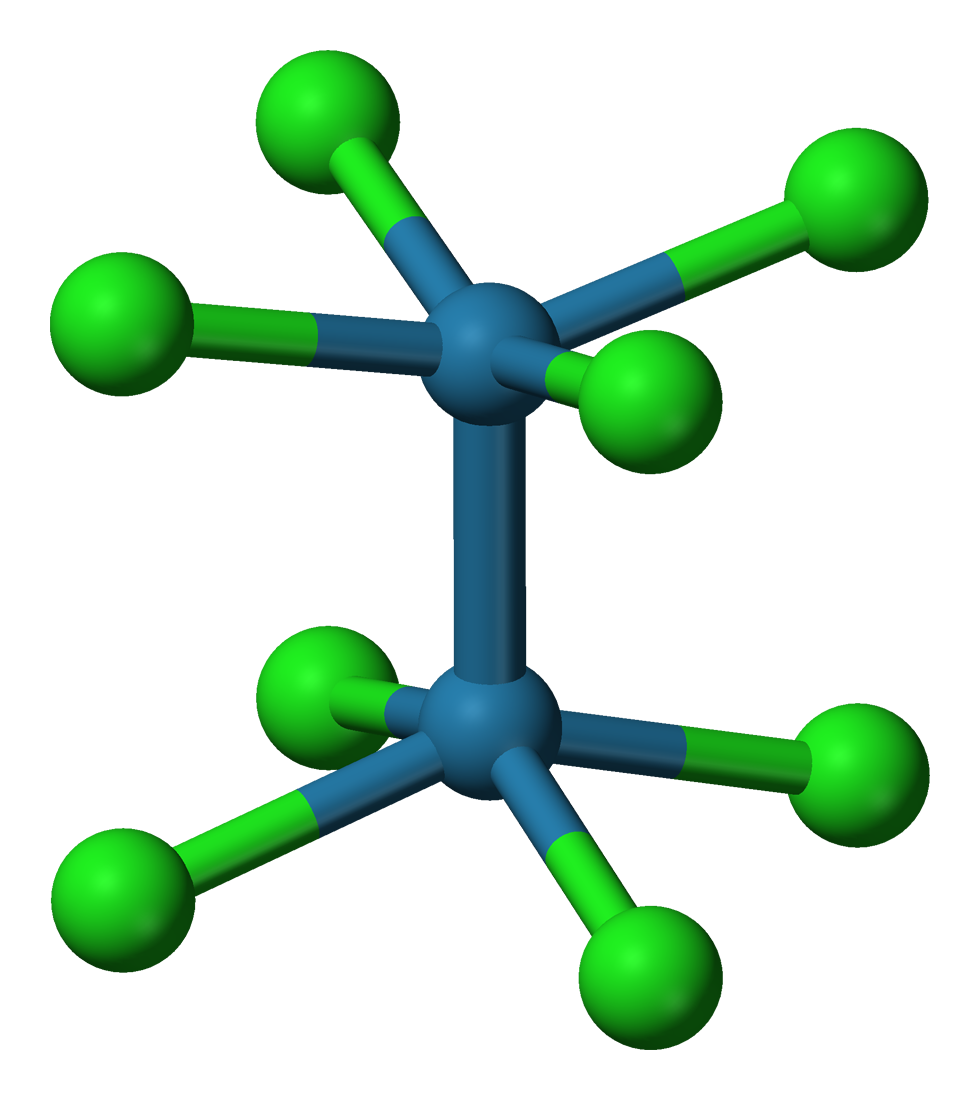
The octachlorodimolybdate(II) anion, [Mo_{2}Cl_{8}]^{4−}, which features a quadruple Mo–Mo bond

== See also ==
- Gauche effect
