= Side-chain =

Side-chain, side chain, or sidechain may refer to:

- Side chain, a chemical group attached to the main chain or backbone of a molecule, such as a protein
- Substituent, an atom or group of atoms substituted in place of a hydrogen atom on the parent chain of a hydrocarbon
- Side-chaining, an effect in digital audio processing
- Sidechain (ledger), a designation for a particular blockchain
- "Sidechain", a song by Knuckle Puck from the album 20/20

== See also ==
- Backbone chain
- Branching (polymer chemistry)
- Pendant group
