= Substituent =

Atom set which has replaced hydrogen atoms on a hydrocarbon's parent chain

In organic chemistry, a substituent is one or a group of atoms that replaces (one or more) atoms, thereby becoming a moiety in the resultant (new) molecule. (Note: In organic chemistry and biochemistry, the terms substituent and functional group, as well as side chain and pendant group, are used almost interchangeably to describe those branches from the parent structure, though certain distinctions are made in polymer chemistry. In polymers, side chains extend from the backbone structure. In proteins, side chains are attached to the alpha carbon atoms of the amino acid backbone.)

The suffix -yl is used when naming organic compounds that contain a single bond replacing one hydrogen; -ylidene and -ylidyne are used with double bonds and triple bonds, respectively. In addition, when naming hydrocarbons that contain a substituent, positional numbers are used to indicate which carbon atom the substituent attaches to when such information is needed to distinguish between isomers. Substituents can be a combination of the inductive effect and the mesomeric effect. Such effects are also described as electron-rich and electron withdrawing. Additional steric effects result from the volume occupied by a substituent.

The phrases most-substituted and least-substituted are frequently used to describe or compare molecules that are products of a chemical reaction. In this terminology, a hydrocarbon is used as a reference of comparison. Using a hydrocarbon as a reference, for each hydrogen atom that is replaced or "substituted" by something else, the molecule can be said to be more highly substituted. For example:

- Markovnikov's rule predicts that the hydrogen atom is added to the carbon of the alkene functional group which has the greater number of hydrogen atoms (fewer alkyl substituents).
- Zaitsev's rule predicts that the major reaction product is the alkene with the more highly substituted (more stable) double bond.

== Nomenclature ==
The suffix -yl is used in organic chemistry to form names of radicals, either separate species (called free radicals) or chemically bonded parts of molecules (called moieties). It can be traced back to the old name of methanol, "methylene" (from Ancient Greek: μέθυ méthu, 'wine' and ὕλη húlē, 'wood', 'forest'), which became shortened to "methyl" in compound names, from which -yl was extracted. Several reforms of chemical nomenclature eventually generalized the use of the suffix to other organic substituents.

The use of the suffix is determined by the number of hydrogen atoms that the substituent replaces on a parent compound (and also, usually, on the substituent). According to the 1993 IUPAC recommendations:

- -yl means that one hydrogen is replaced.
- -ylidene means that two hydrogens are replaced by a double bond between parent and substituent.
- -ylidyne means that three hydrogens are replaced by a triple bond between parent and substituent.

The suffix -ylidine is encountered sporadically, and appears to be a variant spelling of "-ylidene"; it is not mentioned in the IUPAC guidelines.

For multiple bonds of the same type, which link the substituent to the parent group, the infixes -di-, -tri-, -tetra-, etc., are used: -diyl (two single bonds), -triyl (three single bonds), -tetrayl (four single bonds), -diylidene (two double bonds).

For multiple bonds of different types, multiple suffixes are concatenated: -ylylidene (one single and one double), -ylylidyne (one single and one triple), -diylylidene (two single and one double).

The parent compound name can be altered in two ways:

- For many common compounds the substituent is linked at one end (the 1 position) and historically not numbered in the name. The IUPAC 2013 Rules however do require an explicit locant for most substituents in a preferred IUPAC name. The substituent name is modified by stripping -ane (see alkane) and adding the appropriate suffix. This is "recommended only for saturated acyclic and monocyclic hydrocarbon substituent groups and for the mononuclear parent hydrides of silicon, germanium, tin, lead, and boron". Thus, if there is a carboxylic acid called "X-ic acid", an alcohol ending "X-anol" (or "X-yl alcohol"), or an alkane called "X-ane", then "X-yl" typically denotes the same carbon chain lacking these groups but modified by attachment to some other parent molecule.
- The more general method omits only the terminal "e" of the substituent name, but requires explicit numbering of each yl prefix, even at position 1 (except for -ylidyne, which as a triple bond must terminate the substituent carbon chain). Pentan-1-yl is an example of a name by this method, and is synonymous with pentyl from the previous guideline.

Note that some popular terms such as "vinyl" (when used to mean "polyvinyl") represent only a portion of the full chemical name.

== Methane substituents ==
According to the above rules, a carbon atom in a molecule, considered as a substituent, has the following names depending on the number of hydrogens bound to it, and the type of bonds formed with the remainder of the molecule:

CH_{4}	methane	no bonds
−CH_{3}	methyl group or methanyl	one single bond to a non-hydrogen atom
=CH_{2}	methylene group or methanylidene or methylidene	one double bond
−CH_{2}−	methylene bridge or methanediyl or methdiyl	two single bonds
≡CH	methanylidyne group or methylidyne	one triple bond
=CH−	methine group or methanylylidene or methylylidene	one single bond and one double bond
>CH−	methanetriyl group or methtriyl	three single bonds
≡C−	methanylylidyne group or methylylidyne	one triple bond and one single bond
=C=	methanediylidene group or methdiylidene	two double bonds
>C=	methanediylylidene group or methdiylylidene	two single bonds and one double bond
>C<	methanetetrayl group or methtetrayl	four single bonds

== Notation ==
In a chemical structural formula, an organic substituent such as methyl, ethyl, or aryl can be written as R (or R^{1}, R^{2}, etc.) It is a generic placeholder, the R derived from radical or rest, which may replace any portion of the formula as the author finds convenient. The first to use this symbol was Charles Frédéric Gerhardt in 1844.

The symbol X is often used to denote electronegative substituents such as the halides.

== Statistical distribution ==
One cheminformatics study identified 849,574 unique substituents up to 12 non-hydrogen atoms large and containing only carbon, hydrogen, nitrogen, oxygen, sulfur, phosphorus, selenium, and the halogens in a set of 3,043,941 molecules. Fifty substituents can be considered common as they are found in more than 1% of this set, and 438 are found in more than 0.1%. 64% of the substituents are found in only one molecule. The top 5 most common are the methyl, phenyl, chlorine, methoxy, and hydroxyl substituents. The total number of organic substituents in organic chemistry is estimated at 3.1 million, creating a total of 6.7×10^{23} molecules. An infinite number of substituents can be obtained simply by increasing carbon chain length. For instance, the substituents methyl (−CH_{3}) and pentyl (−C_{5}H_{11}).

== See also ==
- Functional groups are a subset of substituents
