= Nuclear DNA =

DNA inside the nucleus of eukaryotic cells

Nuclear DNA (nDNA), or nuclear deoxyribonucleic acid, is the DNA contained within each cell nucleus of a eukaryotic organism. It encodes for the majority of the genome in eukaryotes, with mitochondrial DNA and plastid DNA coding for the rest. It adheres to Mendelian inheritance, with information coming from two parents, one male and one female—rather than matrilineally (through the mother) as in mitochondrial DNA.

== Structure ==
Nuclear DNA is a nucleic acid, a polymeric biomolecule or biopolymer, found in the nucleus of eukaryotic cells. Its structure is a double helix, with two strands wound around each other, a structure first described by Francis Crick and James D. Watson (1953) using data collected by Rosalind Franklin. Each strand is a long polymer chain of repeating nucleotides. Each nucleotide is composed of a five-carbon sugar, a phosphate group, and an organic base. Nucleotides are distinguished by their bases: purines, large bases that include adenine and guanine; and pyrimidines, small bases that include thymine and cytosine. Chargaff's rules state that adenine always pairs with thymine, and guanine always with cytosine. The phosphate groups are held together by a phosphodiester bond and the bases are held together by hydrogen bonds.

== Differences from mitochondrial DNA ==
Nuclear DNA and mitochondrial DNA differ in many ways, starting with location and structure. Nuclear DNA is located within the nucleus of eukaryote cells and usually has two copies per cell while mitochondrial DNA is located in the mitochondria and contains 100–1,000 copies per cell. The structure of nuclear DNA chromosomes is linear with open ends and includes 46 chromosomes and contains for example 3 billion nucleotides in humans while the structure of Mitochondrial DNA chromosome is usually closed, circular, and contains for example 16,569 nucleotides in humans. Nuclear DNA in animals is diploid, ordinarily inheriting the DNA from two parents, while mitochondrial DNA is haploid, coming only from the mother. The mutation rate for nuclear DNA is less than 0.3% while that of mitochondrial DNA is generally higher.

== Forensics ==
Nuclear DNA is known as the molecule of life and contains the genetic instructions for the development of all eukaryotic organisms. It is found in almost every cell in the human body, with exceptions such as red blood cells. Everyone has a unique genetic blueprint, even identical twins. Forensic departments such as the Bureau of Criminal Apprehension (BCA) and Federal Bureau of Investigation (FBI) use techniques involving nuclear DNA to compare samples in a case. Techniques used include polymerase chain reaction (PCR), which allows one to utilize very small amounts of DNA by making copies of targeted regions on the molecule, also known as short tandem repeats (STRs).

== Cell division ==
Like mitosis, meiosis is a form of eukaryotic cell division. Meiosis gives rise to four unique daughter cells, each of which has half the number of chromosomes as the parent cell. Because meiosis creates cells that are destined to become gametes (or reproductive cells), this reduction in chromosome number is critical — without it, the union of two gametes during fertilization would result in offspring with twice the normal number of chromosomes.

Meiosis creates new combinations of genetic material in each of the four daughter cells. These new combinations result from the exchange of DNA between paired chromosomes. Such an exchange means that the gametes produced through meiosis often exhibit considerable genetic variation.

Meiosis involves two rounds of nuclear division, not just one. Prior to undergoing meiosis, a cell goes through an interphase period in which it grows, replicates its chromosomes, and checks all of its systems to ensure that it is ready to divide.

Like mitosis, meiosis also has distinct stages called prophase, metaphase, anaphase, and telophase. A key difference, however, is that during meiosis, each of these phases occurs twice — once during the first round of division, called meiosis I, and again during the second round of division, called meiosis II.

== Replication ==
Prior to cell division, the DNA material in the original cell must be duplicated so that after cell division, each new cell contains the full amount of DNA material. The process of DNA duplication is usually called replication. The replication is termed semiconservative since each new cell contains one strand of original DNA and one newly synthesized strand of DNA. The original polynucleotide strand of DNA serves as a template to guide the synthesis of the new complementary polynucleotide of DNA. The DNA single-strand template serves to guide the synthesis of a complementary strand of DNA.

DNA replication begins at a specific site in the DNA molecule called the origin of replication. The enzyme helicase unwinds and separates a portion of the DNA molecule after which single-strand binding proteins react with and stabilize the separated, single-stranded sections of the DNA molecule. The enzyme complex DNA polymerase engages the separated portion of the molecule and initiates the process of replication. DNA polymerase can only connect new DNA nucleotides to a pre-existing chain of nucleotides. Therefore, replication begins as an enzyme called primase assembles an RNA primer at the origin of replication. The RNA primer consists of a short sequence of RNA nucleotides, complementary to a small, initial section of the DNA strand being prepared for replication. DNA polymerase then adds DNA nucleotides to the RNA primer and thus begins the process of constructing a new complementary strand of DNA. Later the RNA primer is enzymatically removed and replaced with the appropriate sequence of DNA nucleotides. Because the two complementary strands of the DNA molecule are oriented in opposite directions and the DNA polymerase can only accommodate replication in one direction, two different mechanisms for copying the strands of DNA are employed. One strand is replicated continuously toward unwinding, separating the portion of the original DNA molecule; while the other strand is replicated discontinuously in the opposite direction with the formation of a series of short DNA segments called Okazaki fragments. Each Okazaki fragment requires a separate RNA primer. As the Okazaki fragments are synthesized, the RNA primers are replaced with DNA nucleotides and the fragments are bonded together in a continuous complementary strand.

== DNA damage and repair ==
Damage of nuclear DNA is a persistent problem arising from a variety of disruptive endogenous and exogenous sources. Eukaryotes have evolved a diverse set of DNA repair processes that remove nuclear DNA damages. These repair processes include base excision repair, nucleotide excision repair, homologous recombinational repair, non-homologous end joining, and microhomology-mediated end joining. Such repair processes are essential for maintaining nuclear DNA stability. Failure of repair activity to keep up with the occurrence of damages has various negative consequences. Nuclear DNA damages, as well as the mutations and epigenetic alterations that such damages cause, are considered to be a major cause of cancer. Nuclear DNA damages are also implicated in aging and neurodegeneration.

== Mutation ==
Nuclear DNA is subject to mutation. A major cause of mutation is inaccurate DNA replication, often by specialized DNA polymerases that synthesize past DNA damages in the template strand (error-prone trans-lesion synthesis). Mutations also arise by inaccurate DNA repair. The microhomology-mediated end joining pathway for repair of double-strand breaks is particularly prone to mutation. Mutations arising in the nuclear DNA of the germline are most often neutral or adaptively disadvantageous. However, the small proportion of mutations that prove to be advantageous provide the genetic variation upon which natural selection operates to generate new adaptations.

== Gallery ==
The human nuclear DNA displayed into chromosome ideograms with label from Human Genome Project (1990-2003)

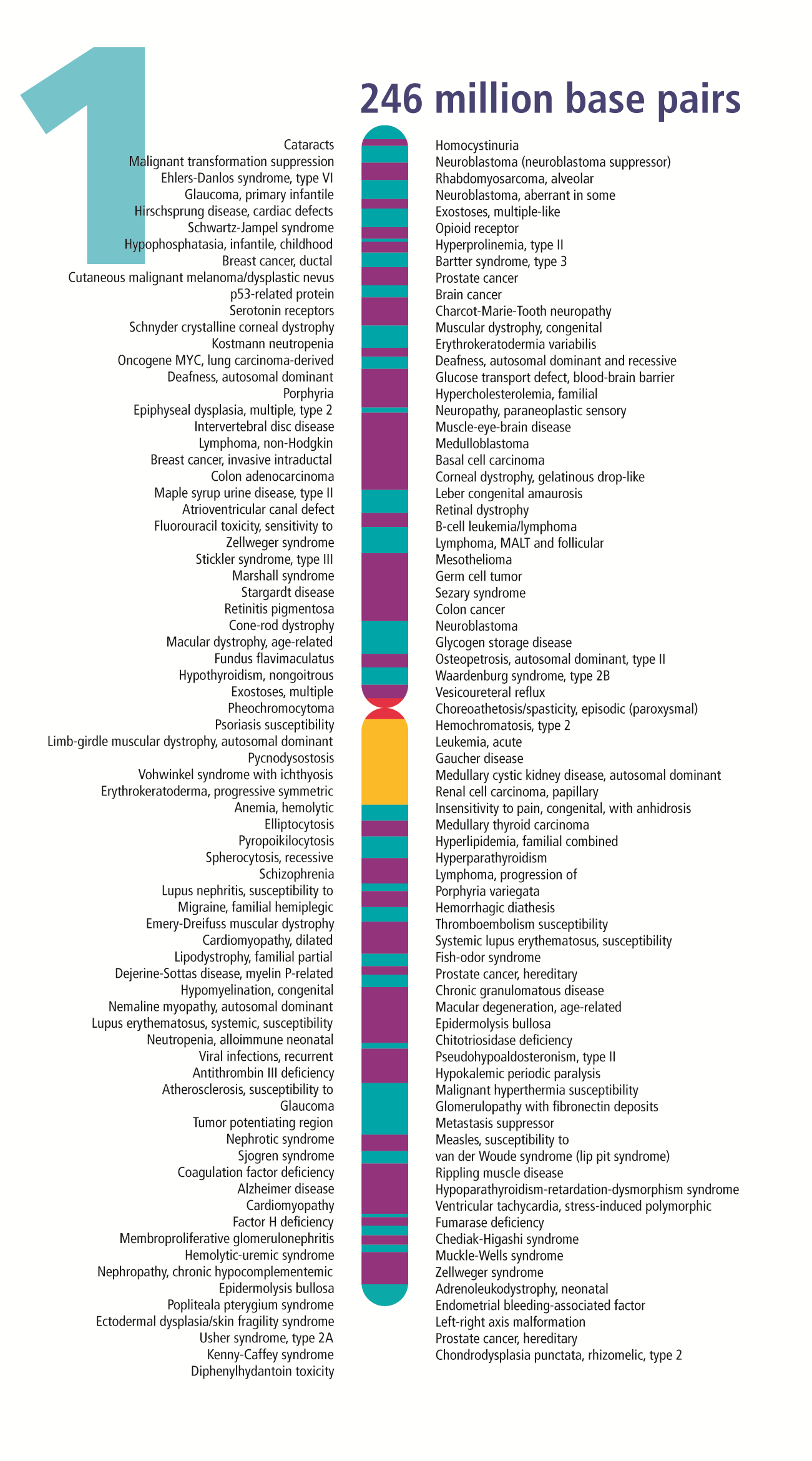

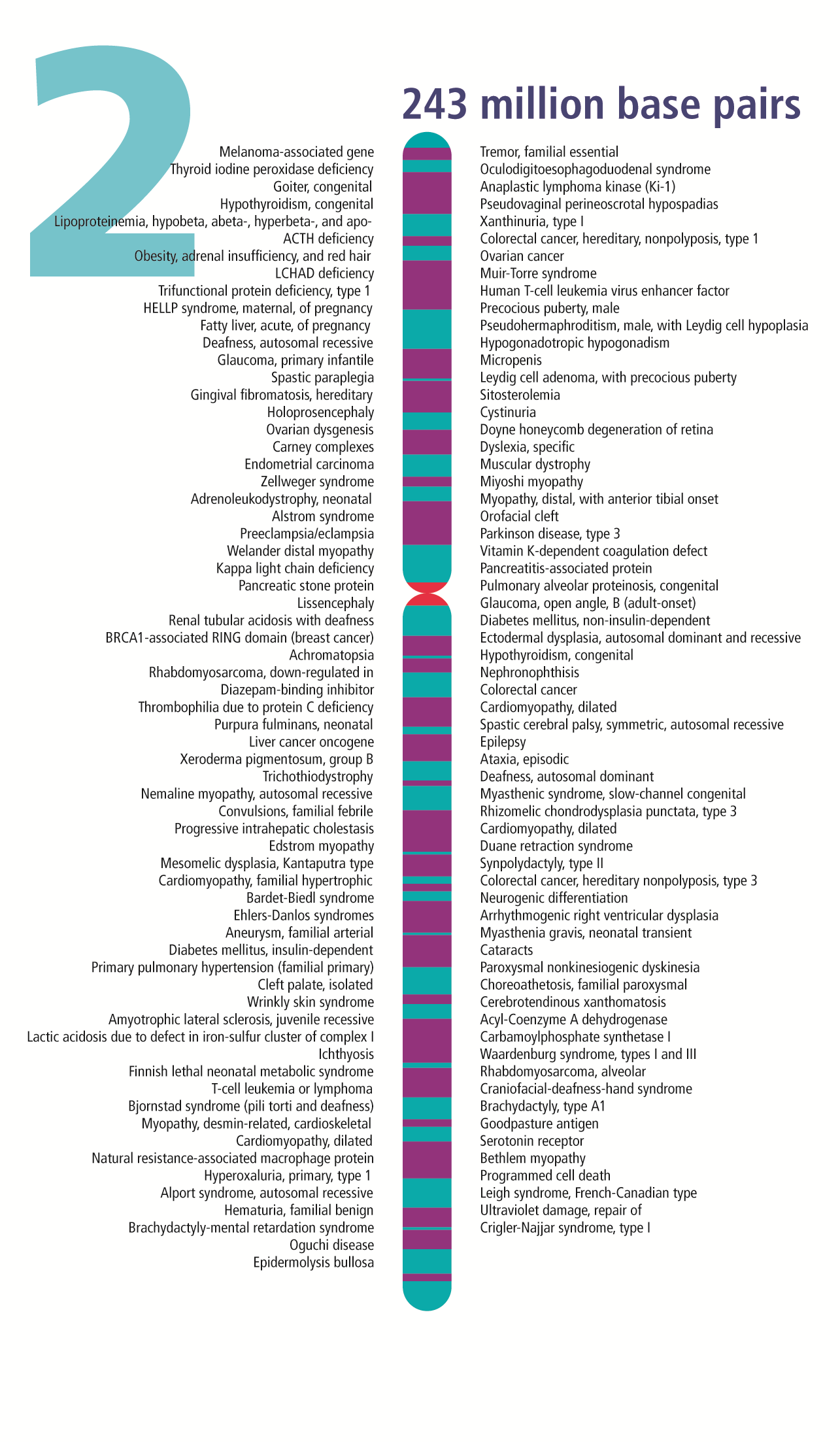

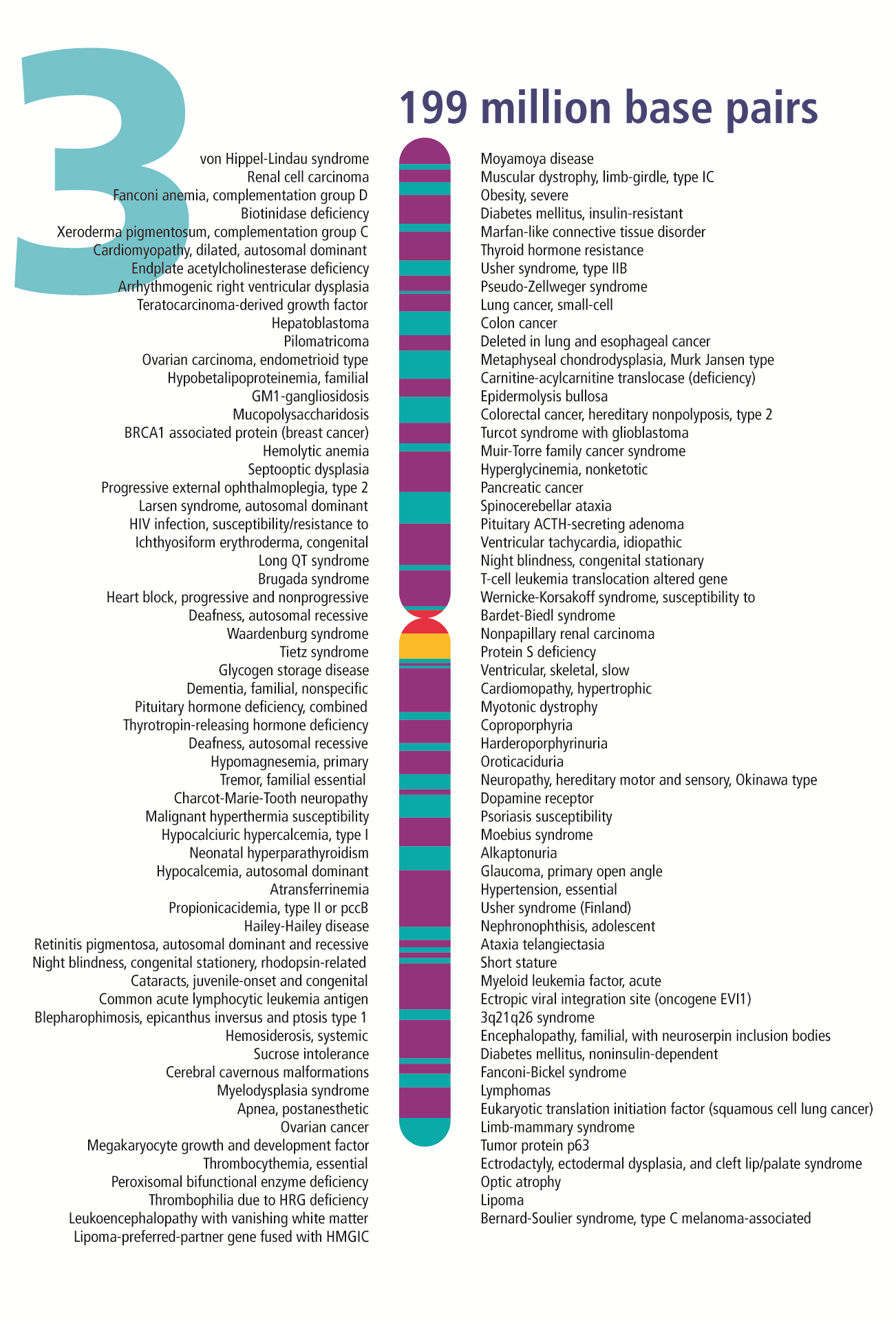

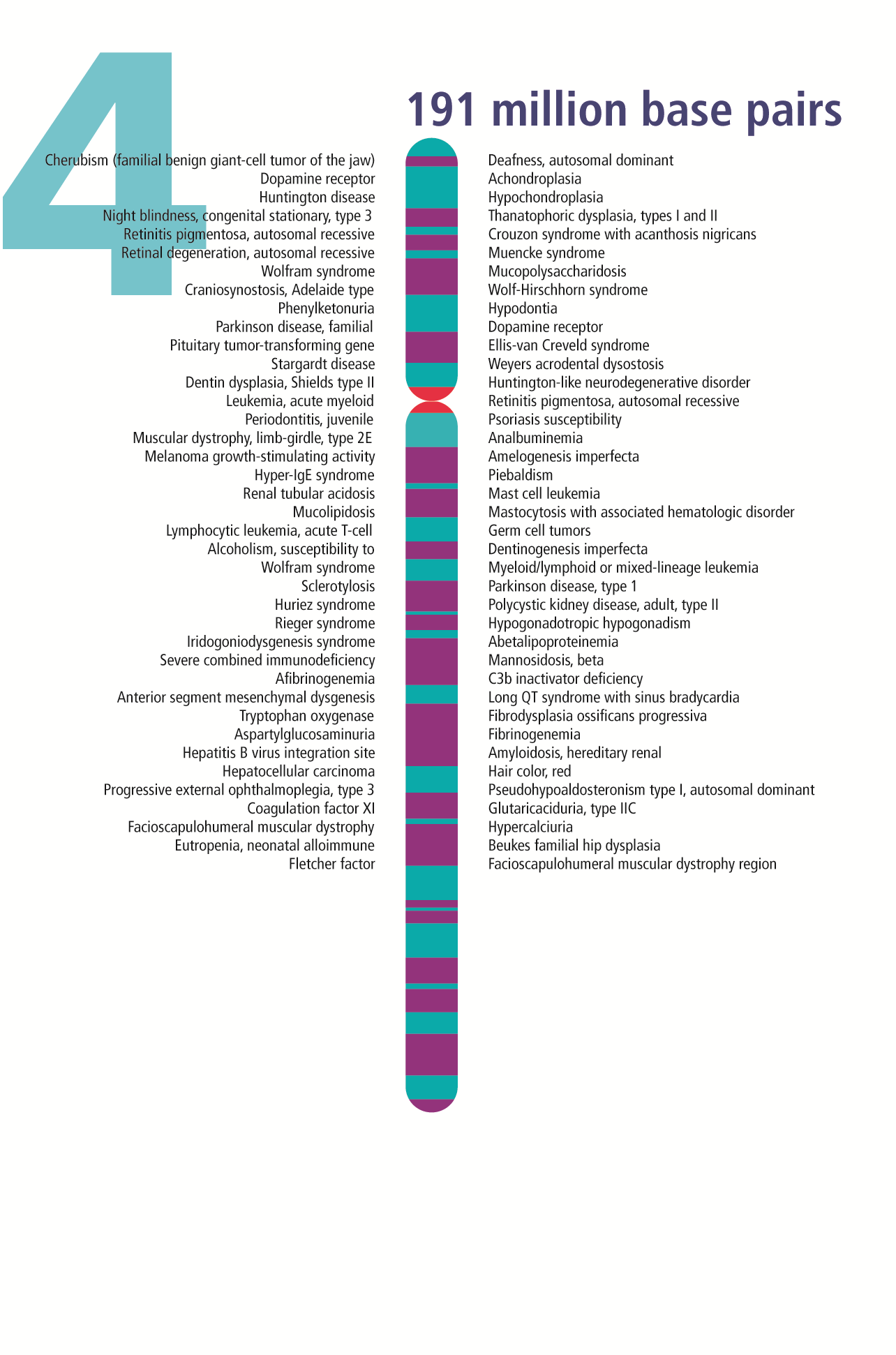

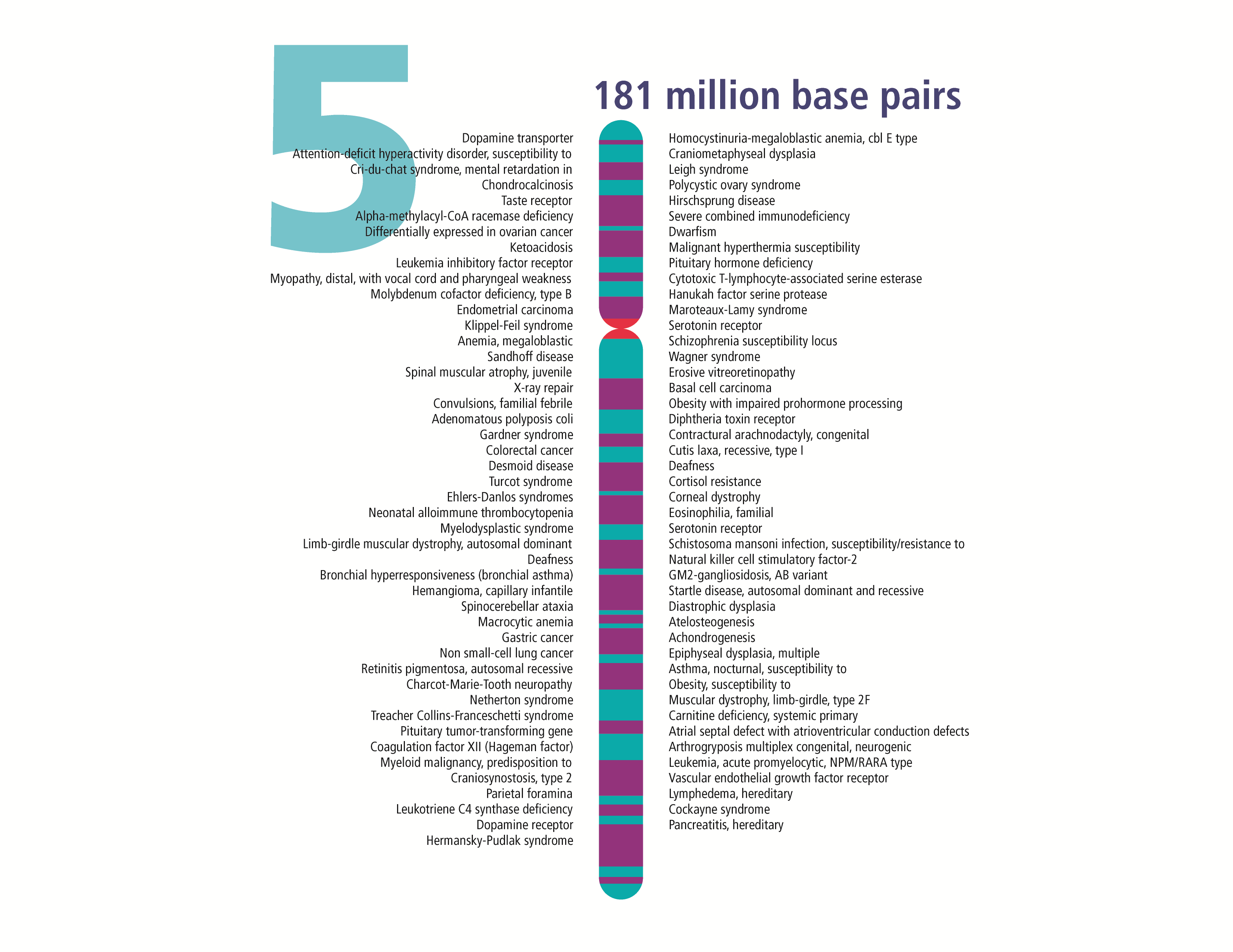

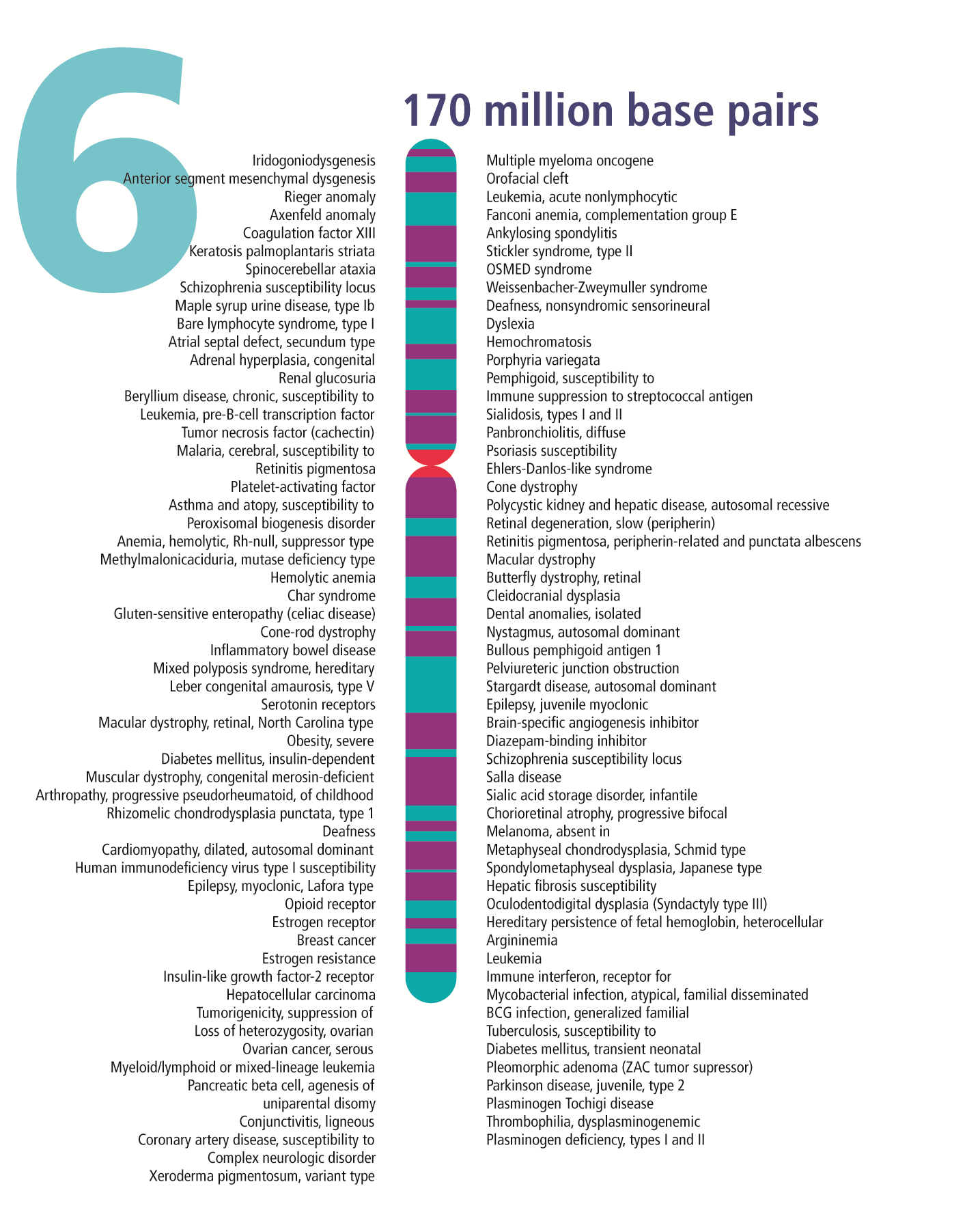

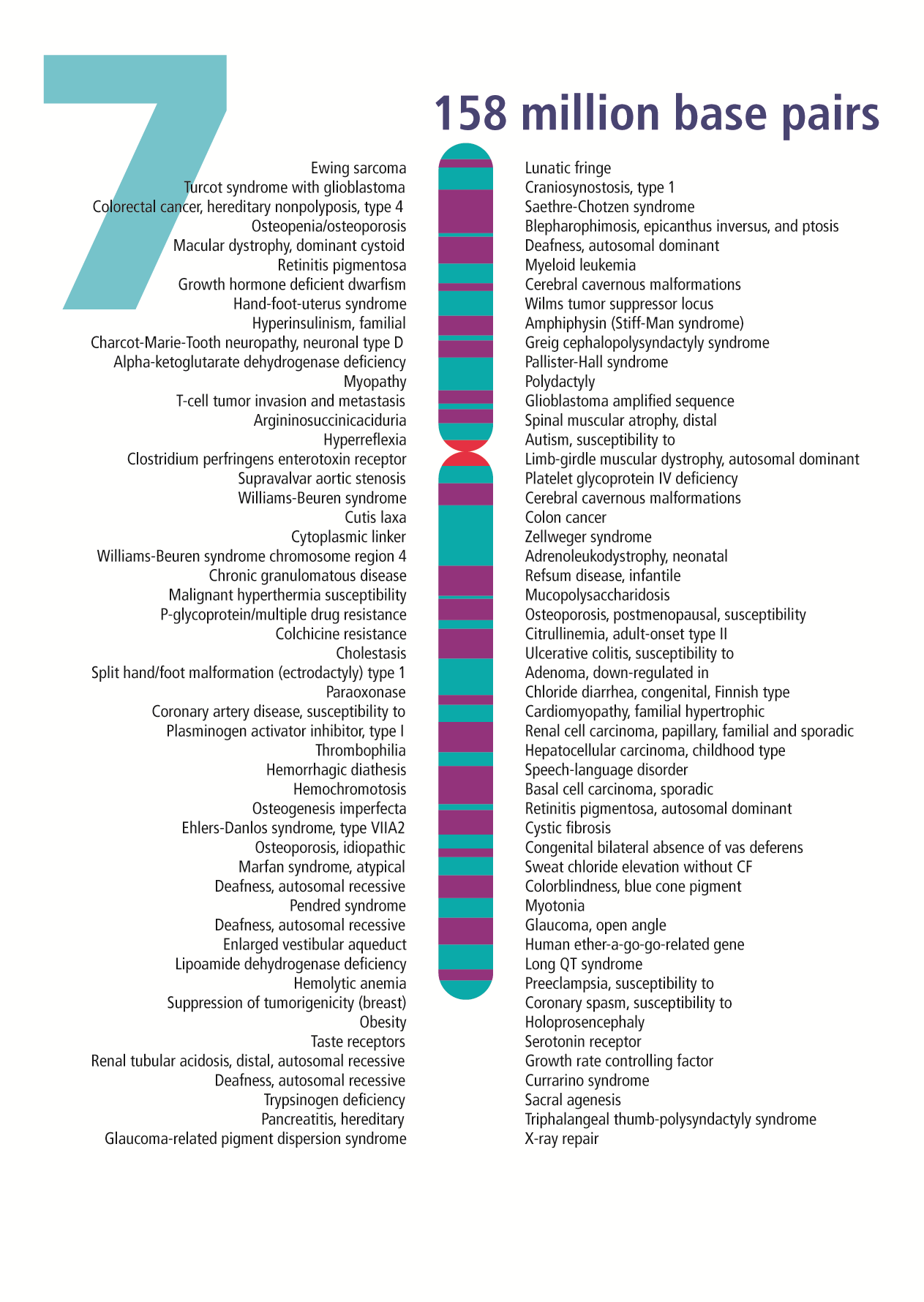

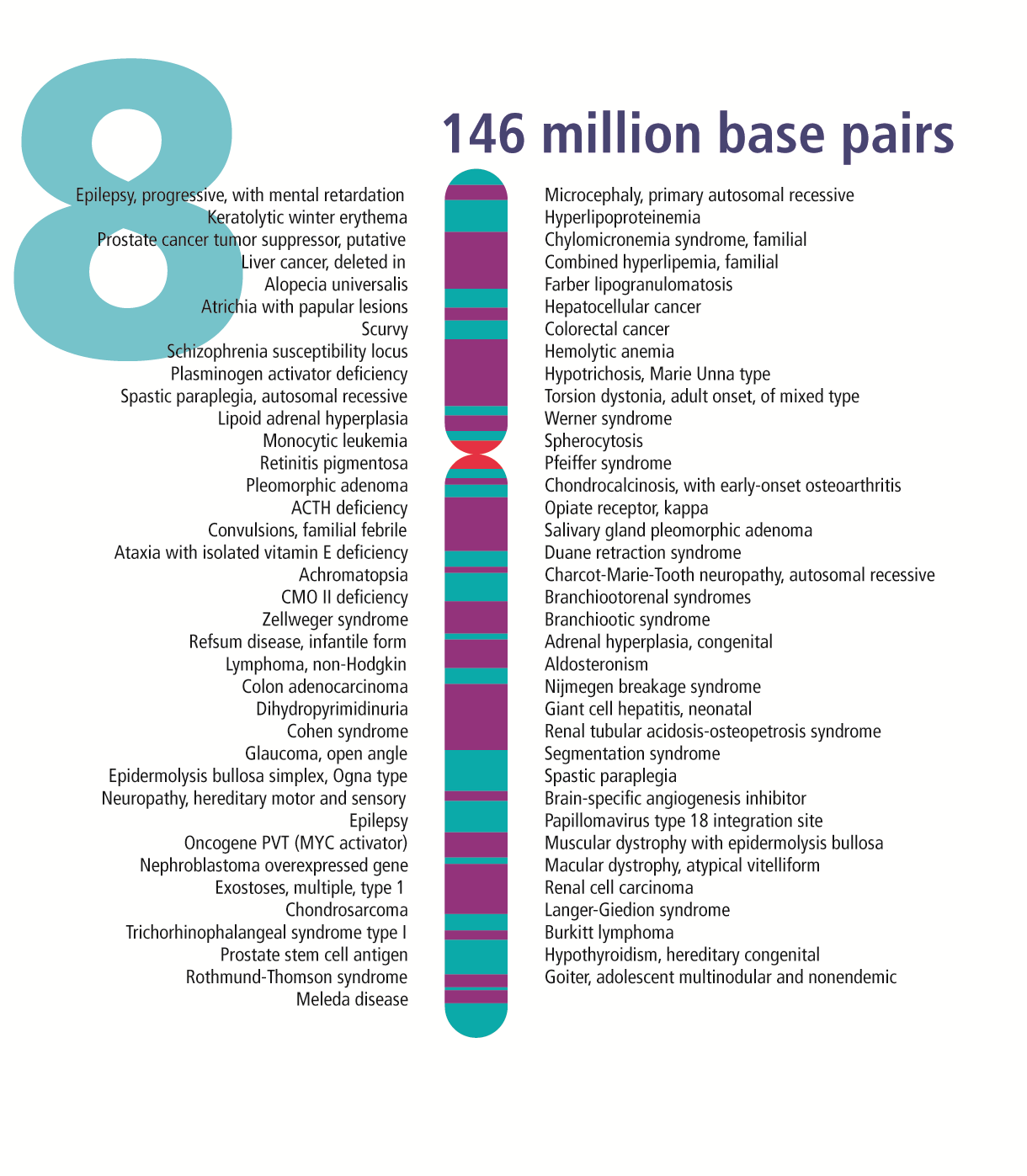

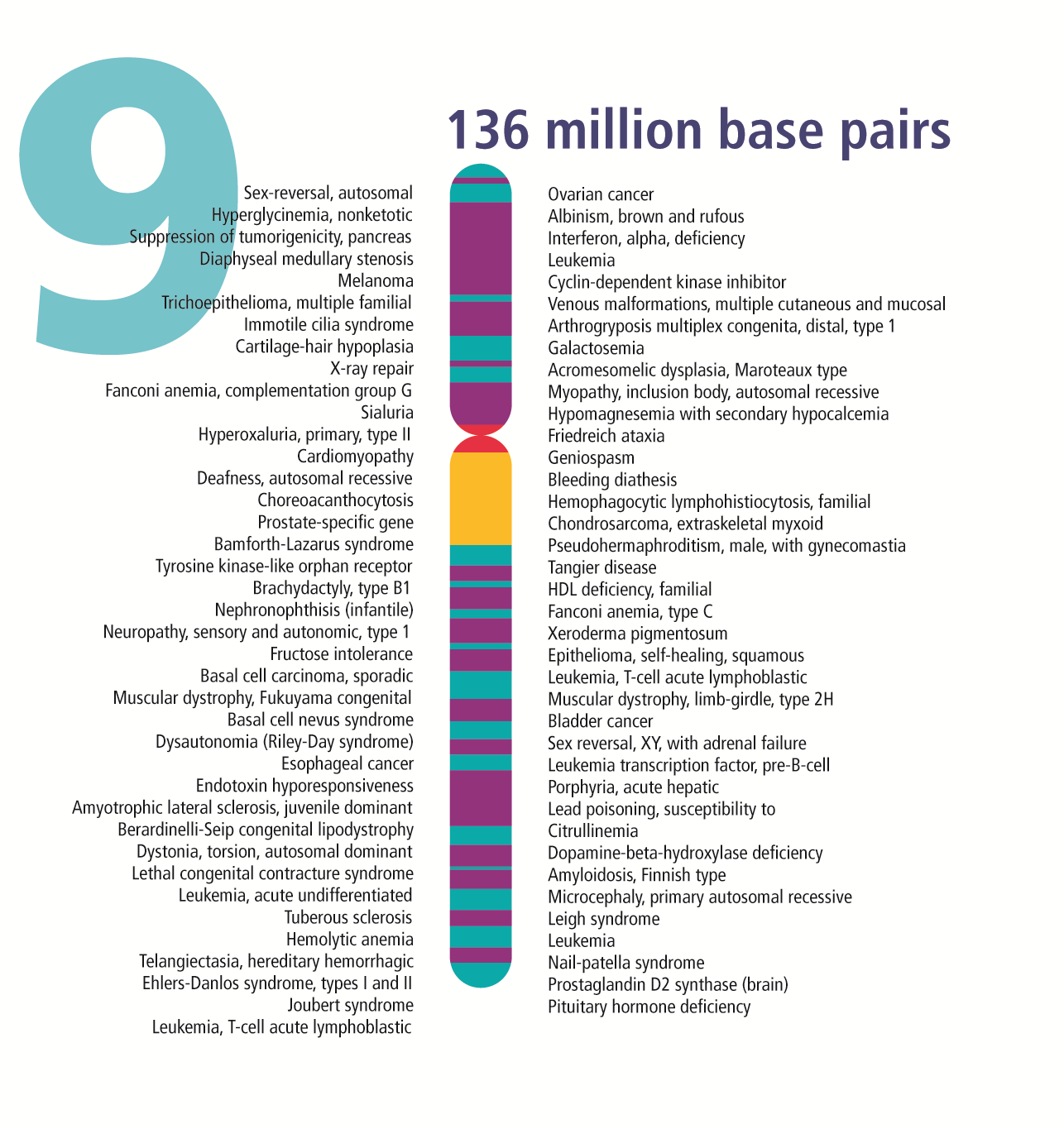

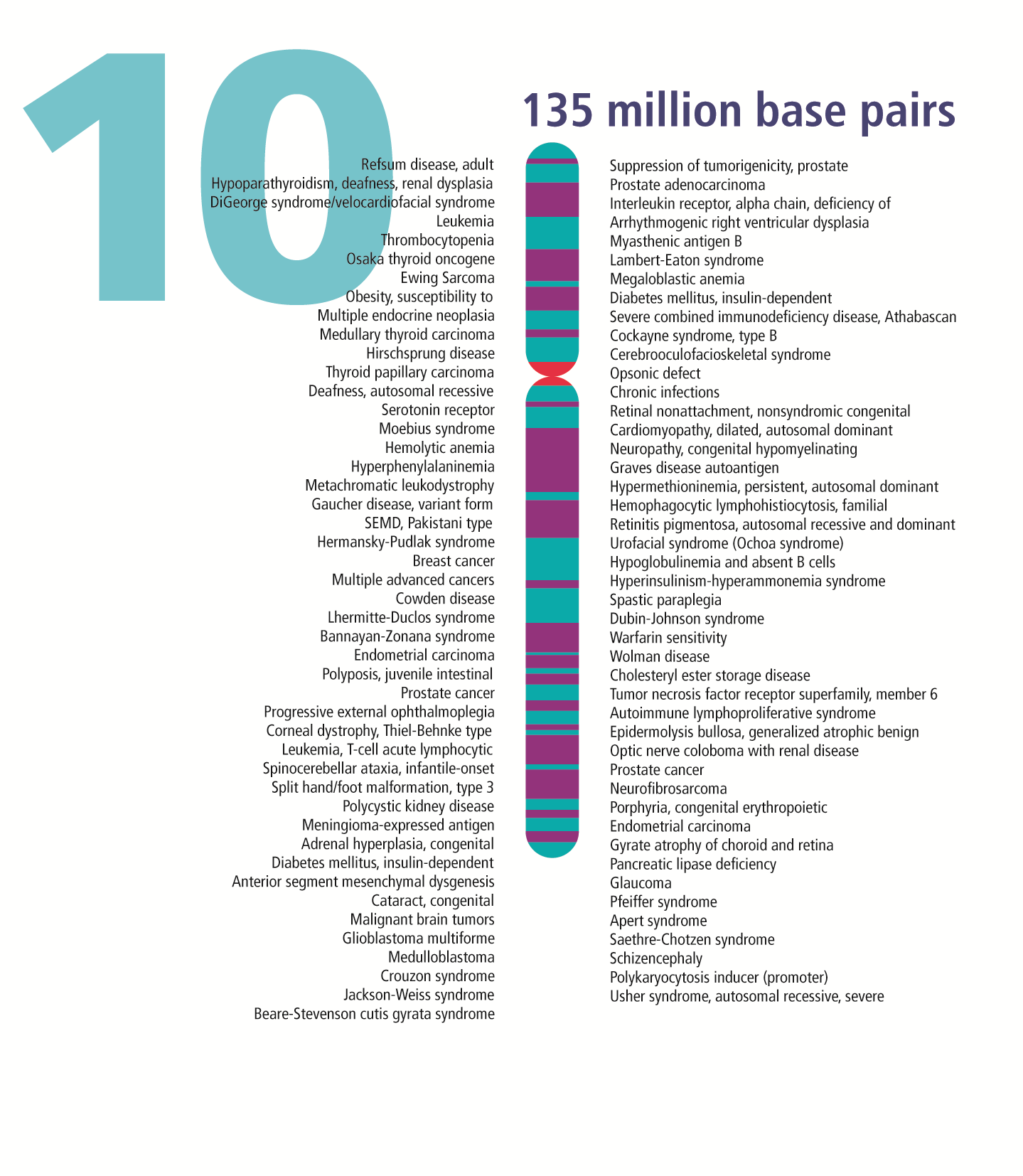

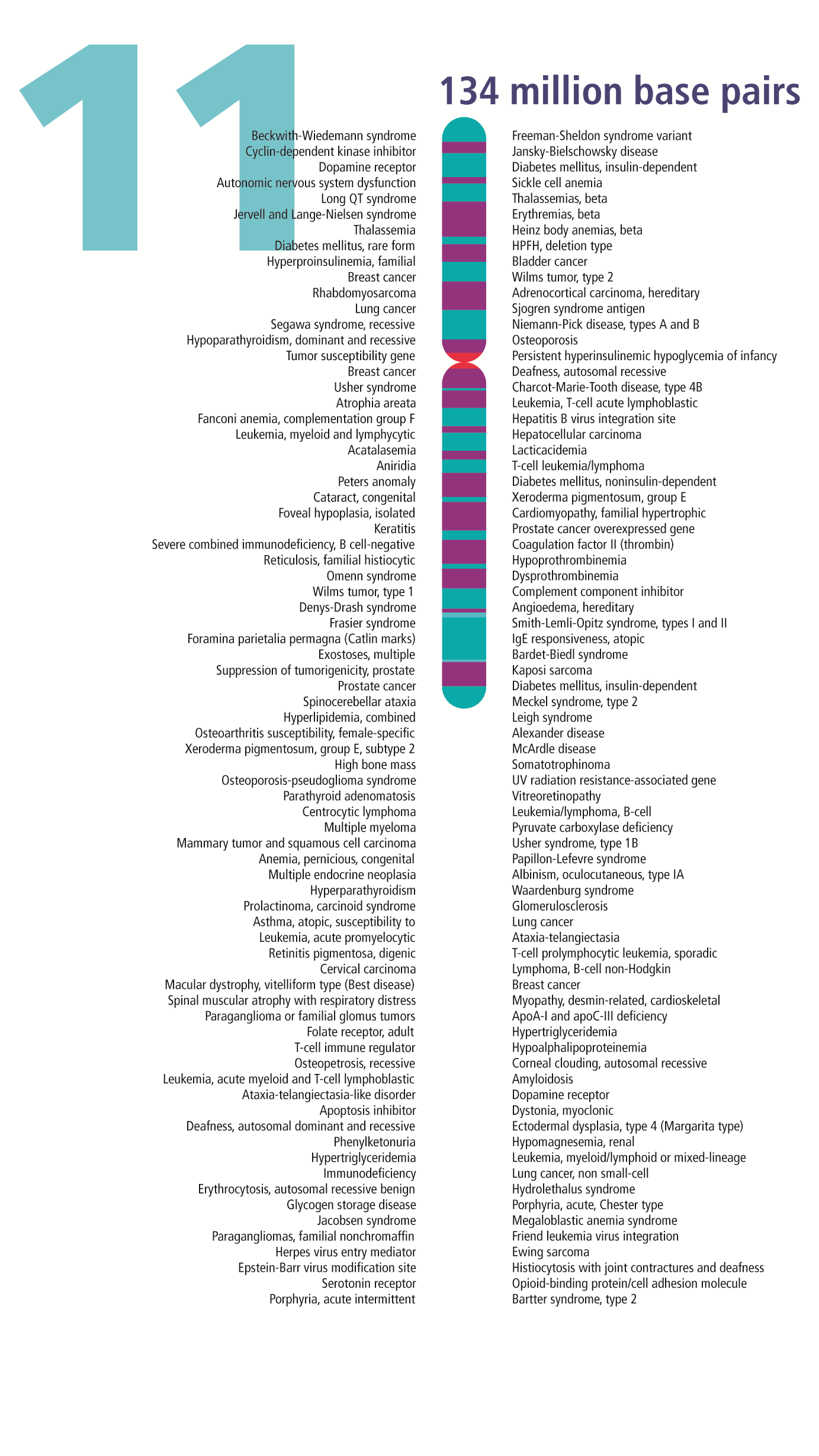

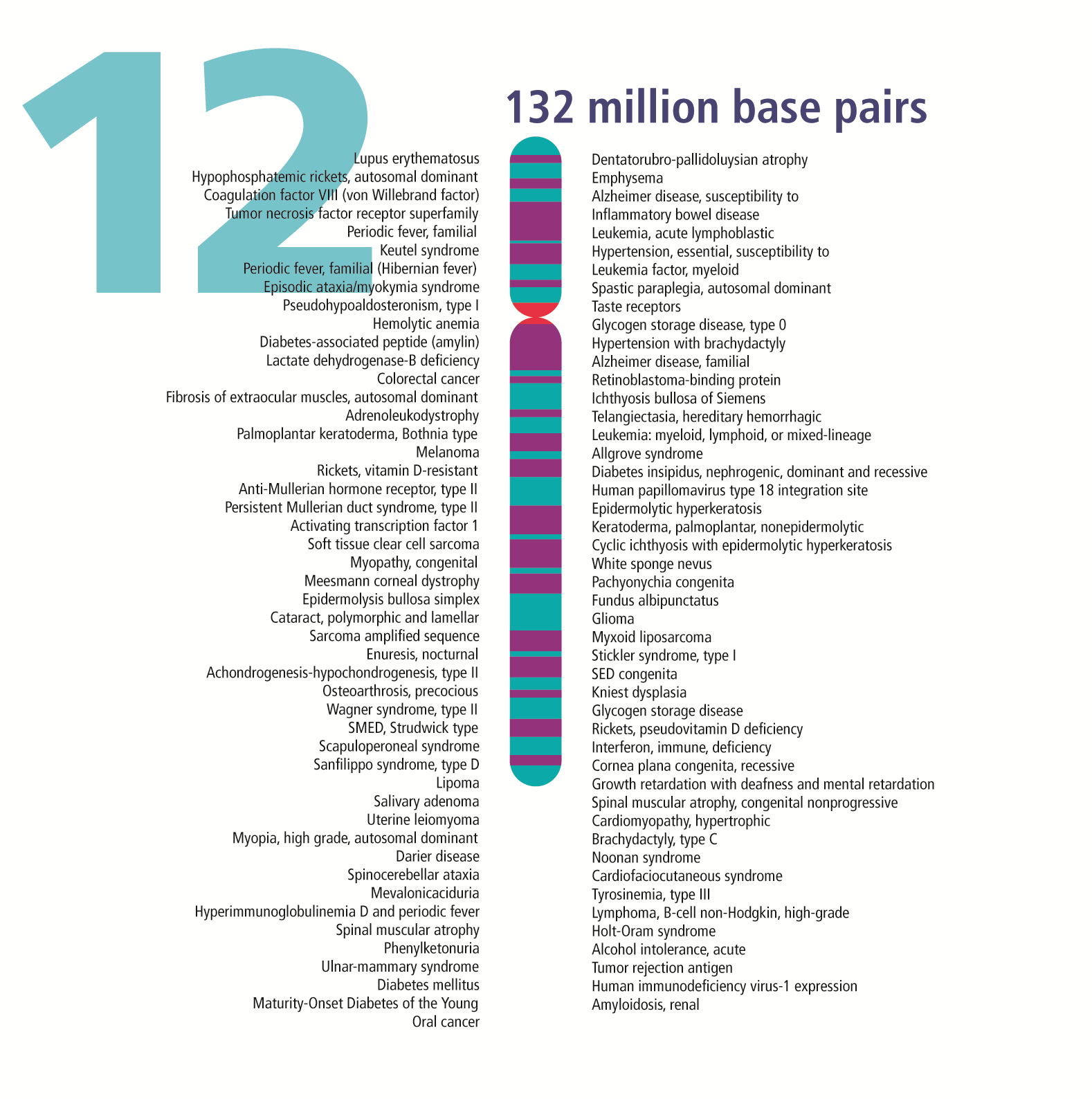

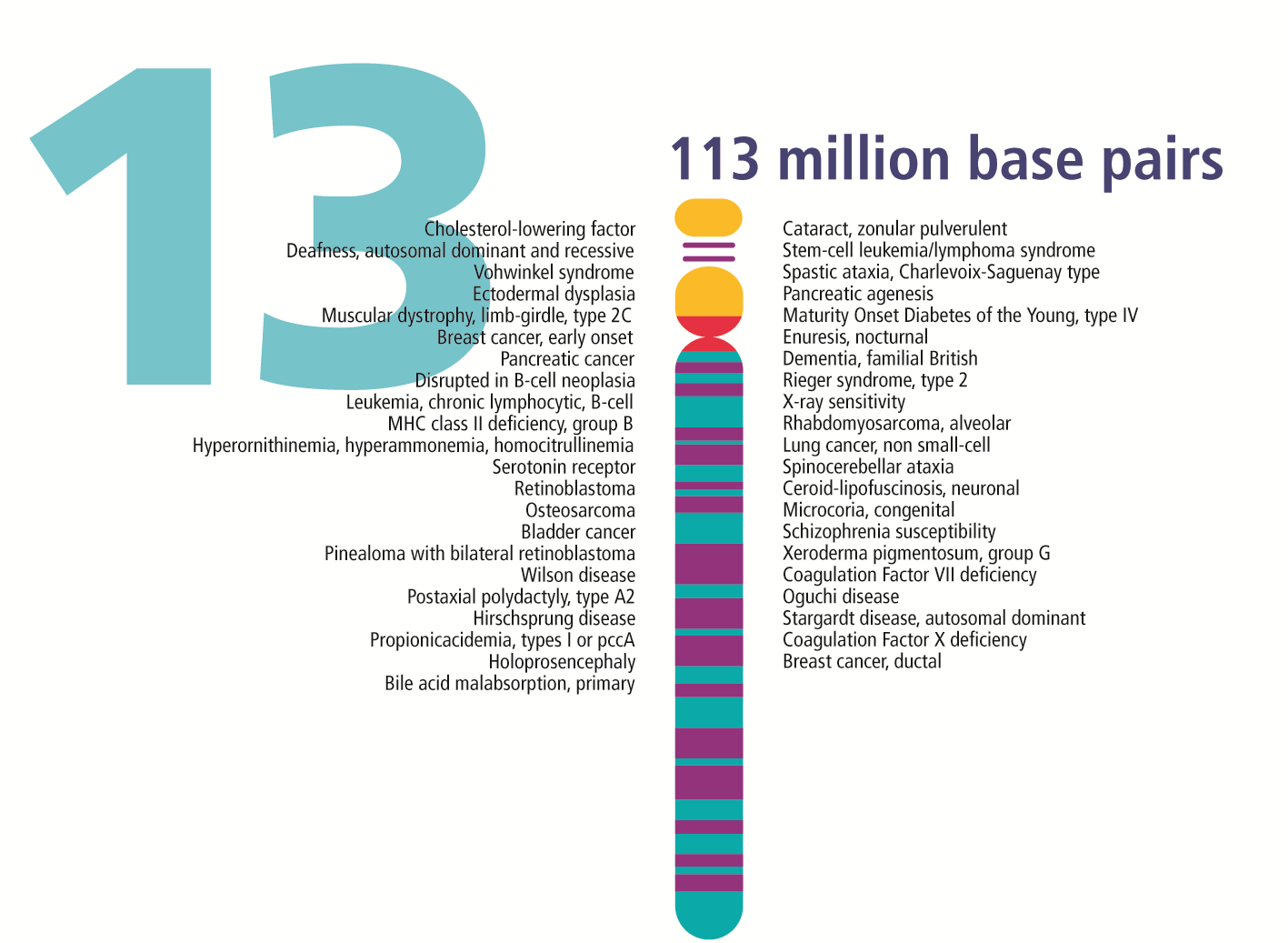

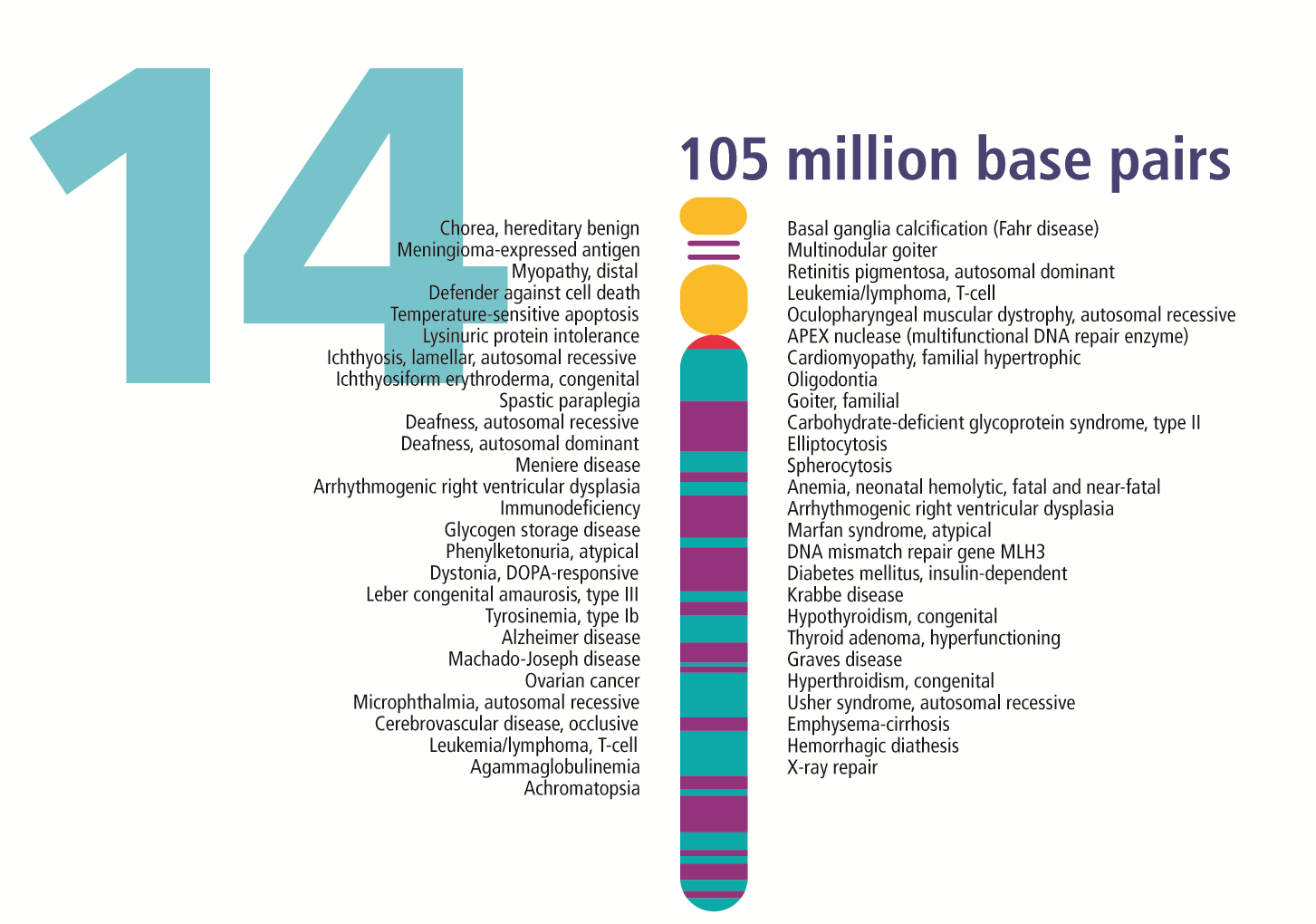

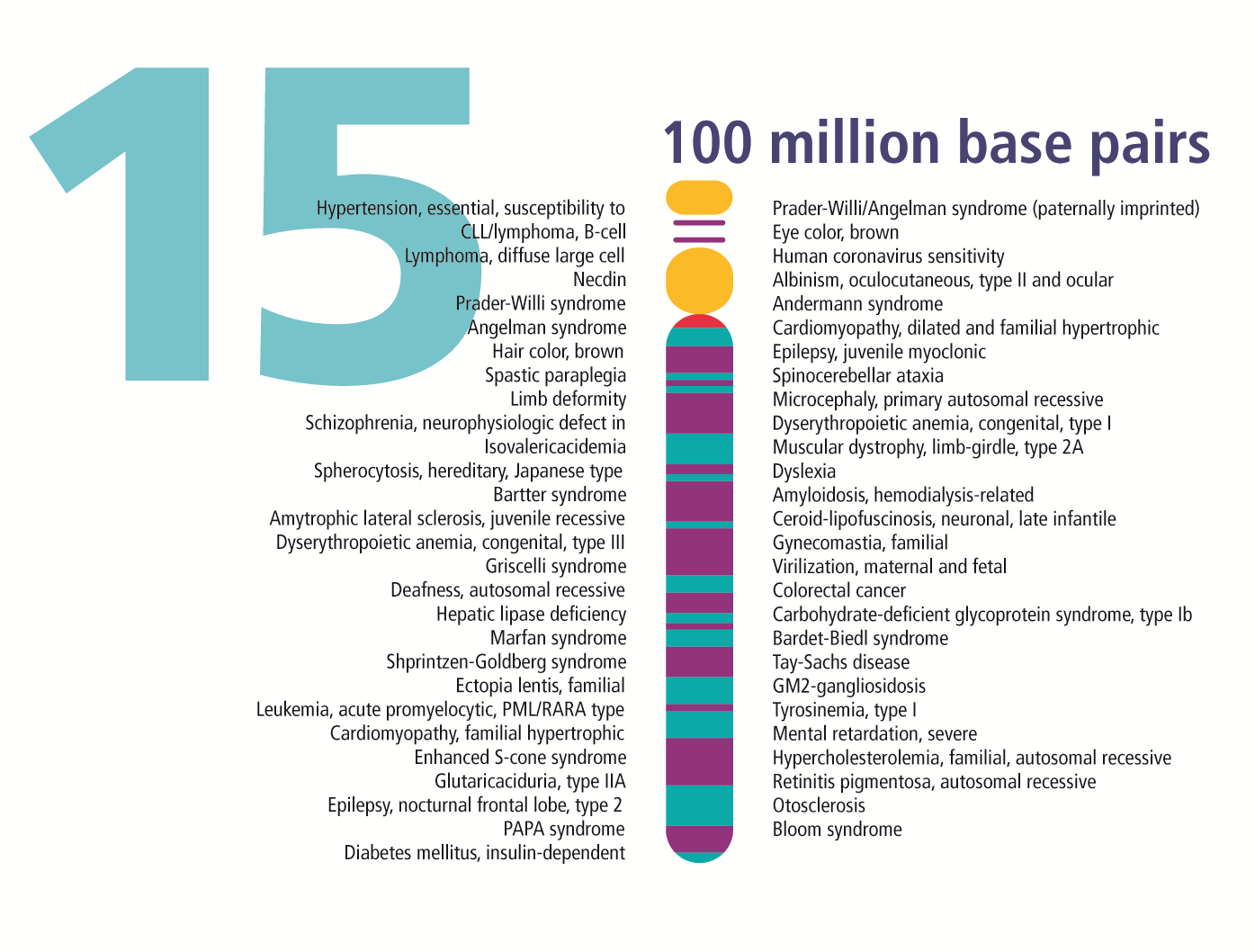

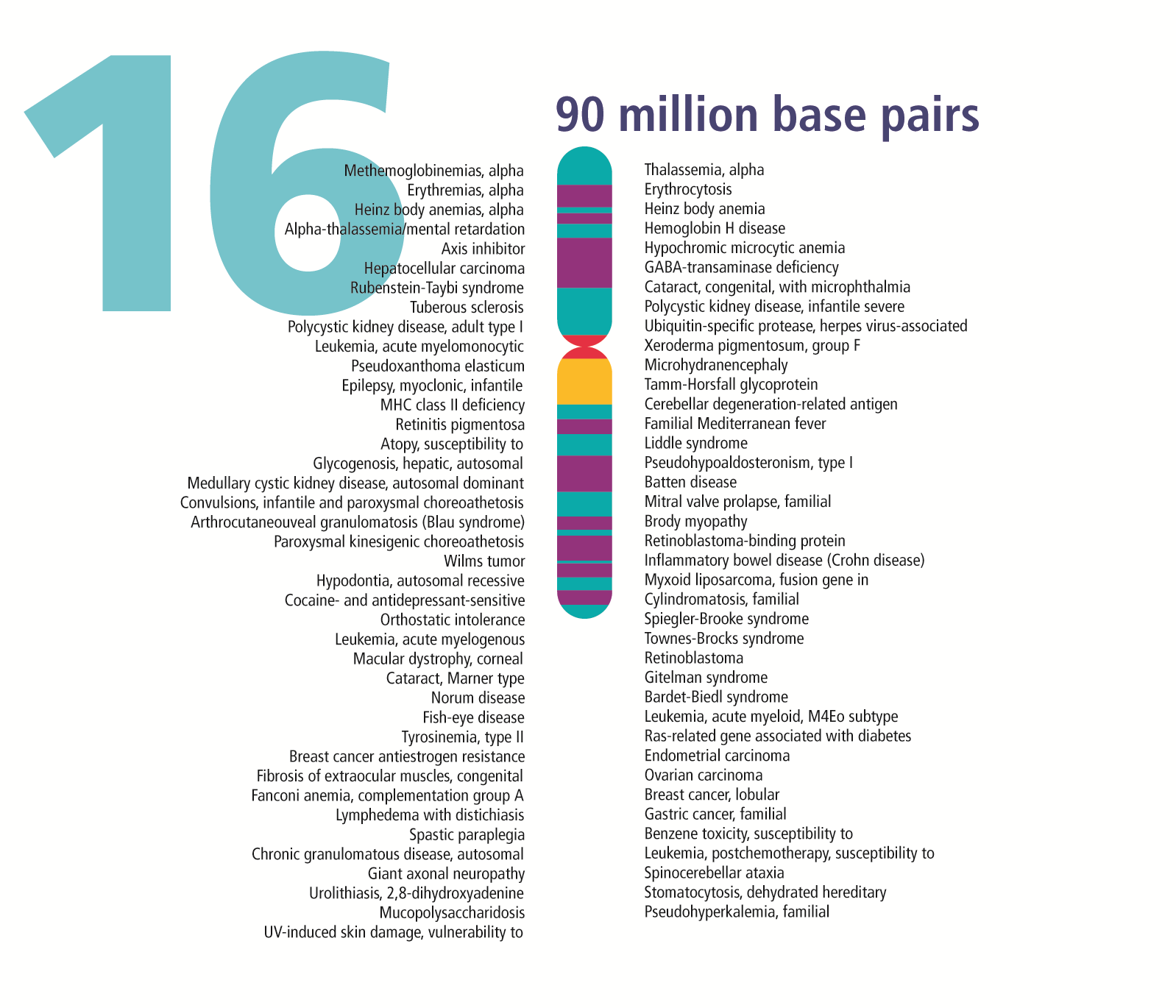

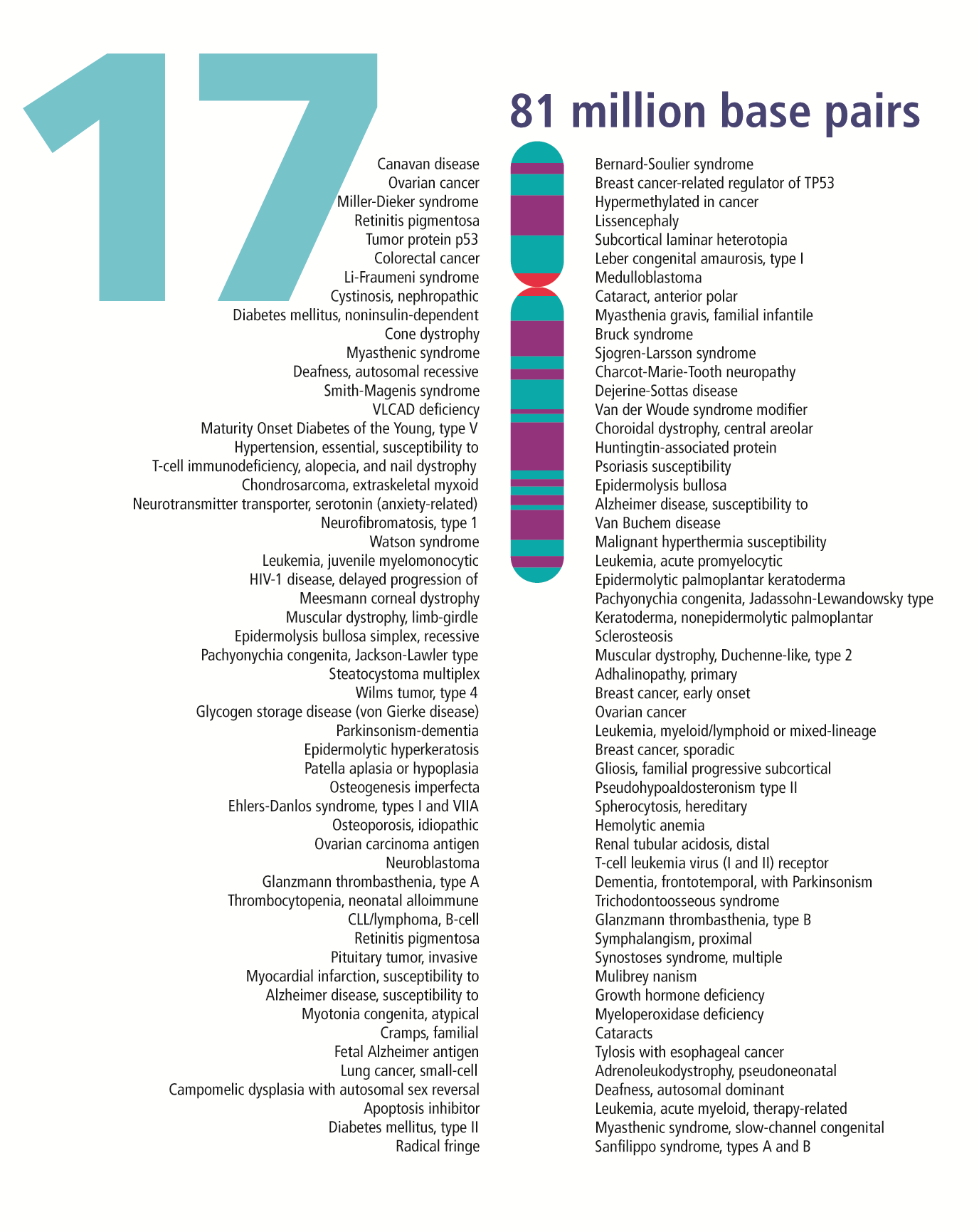

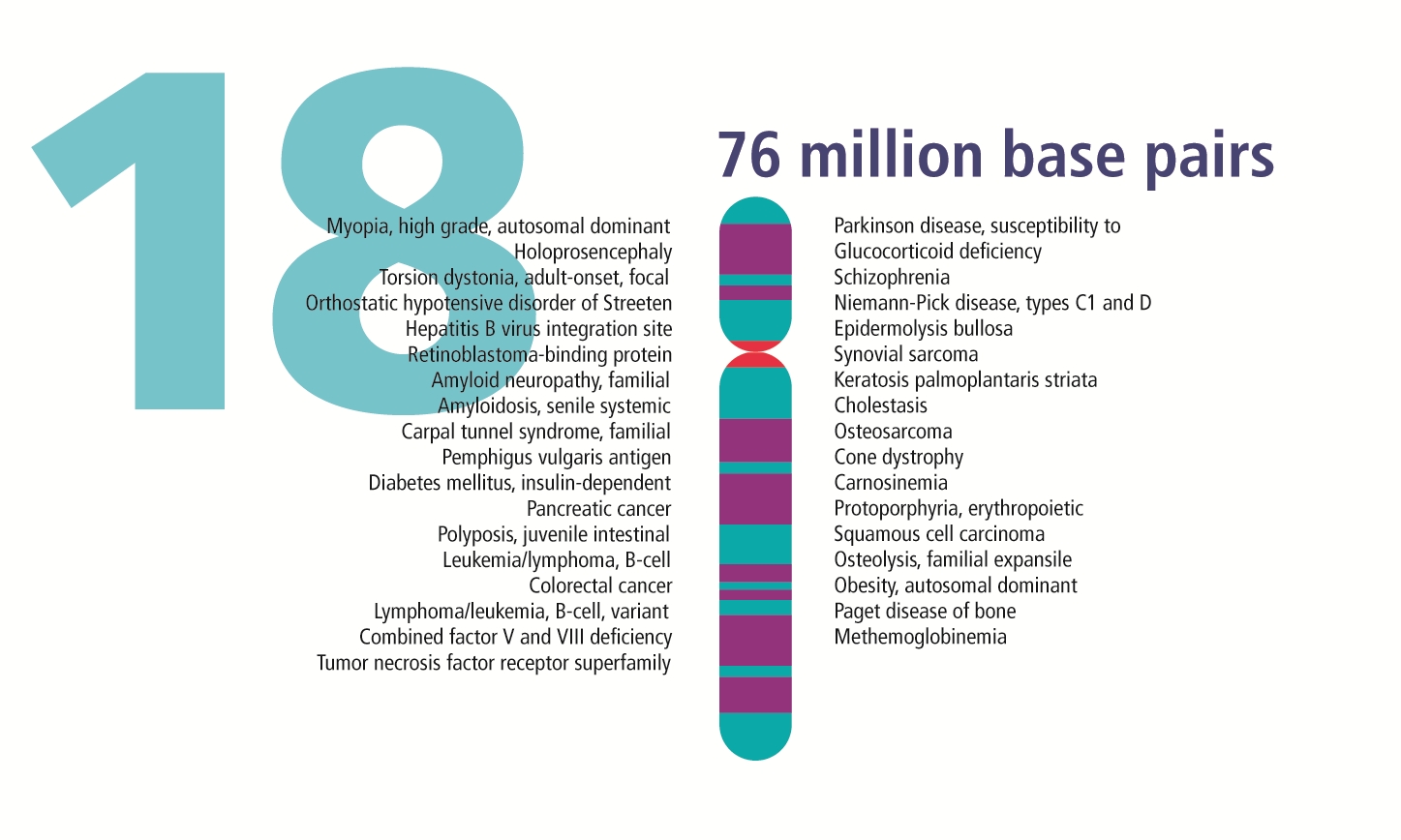

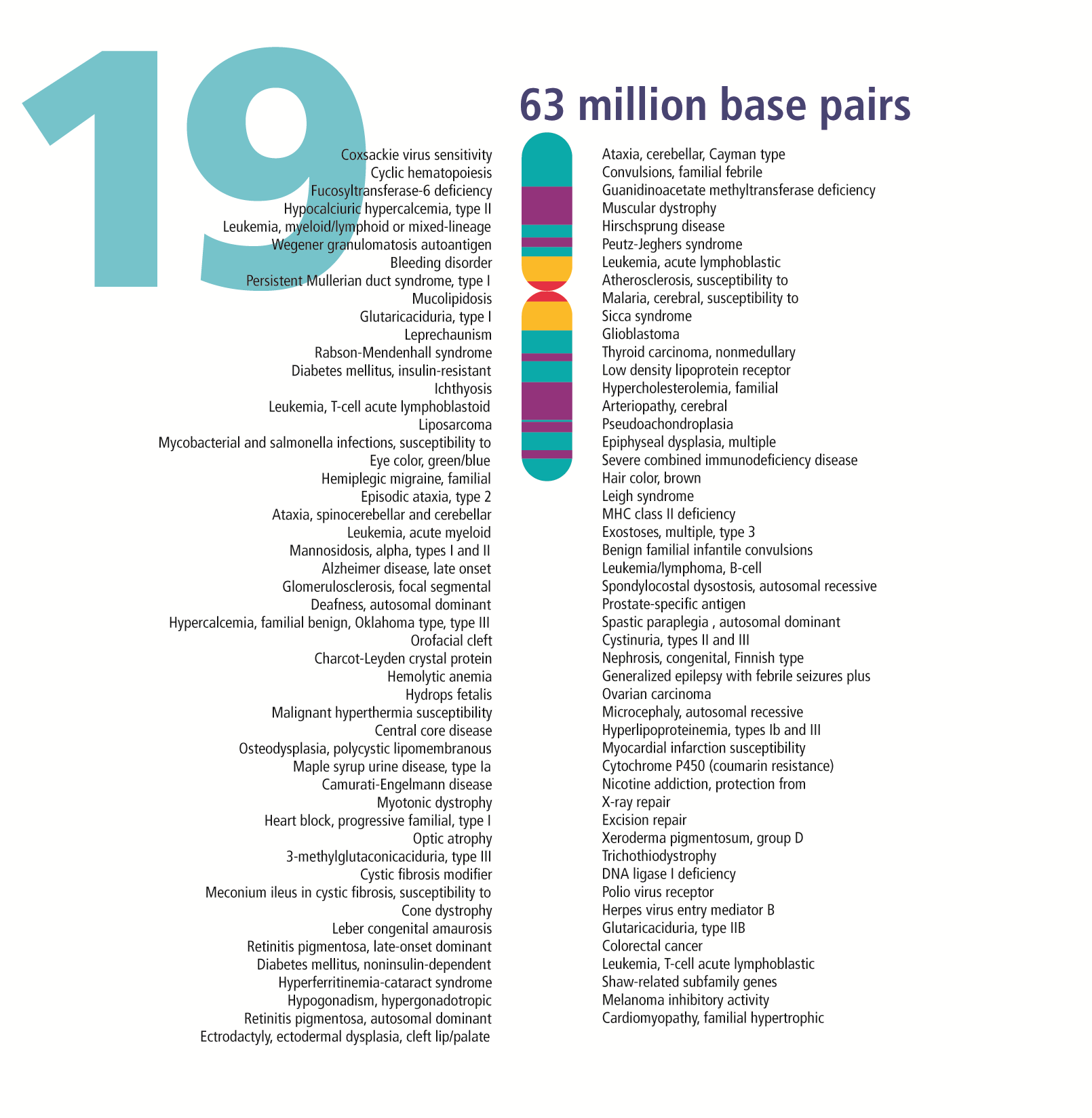

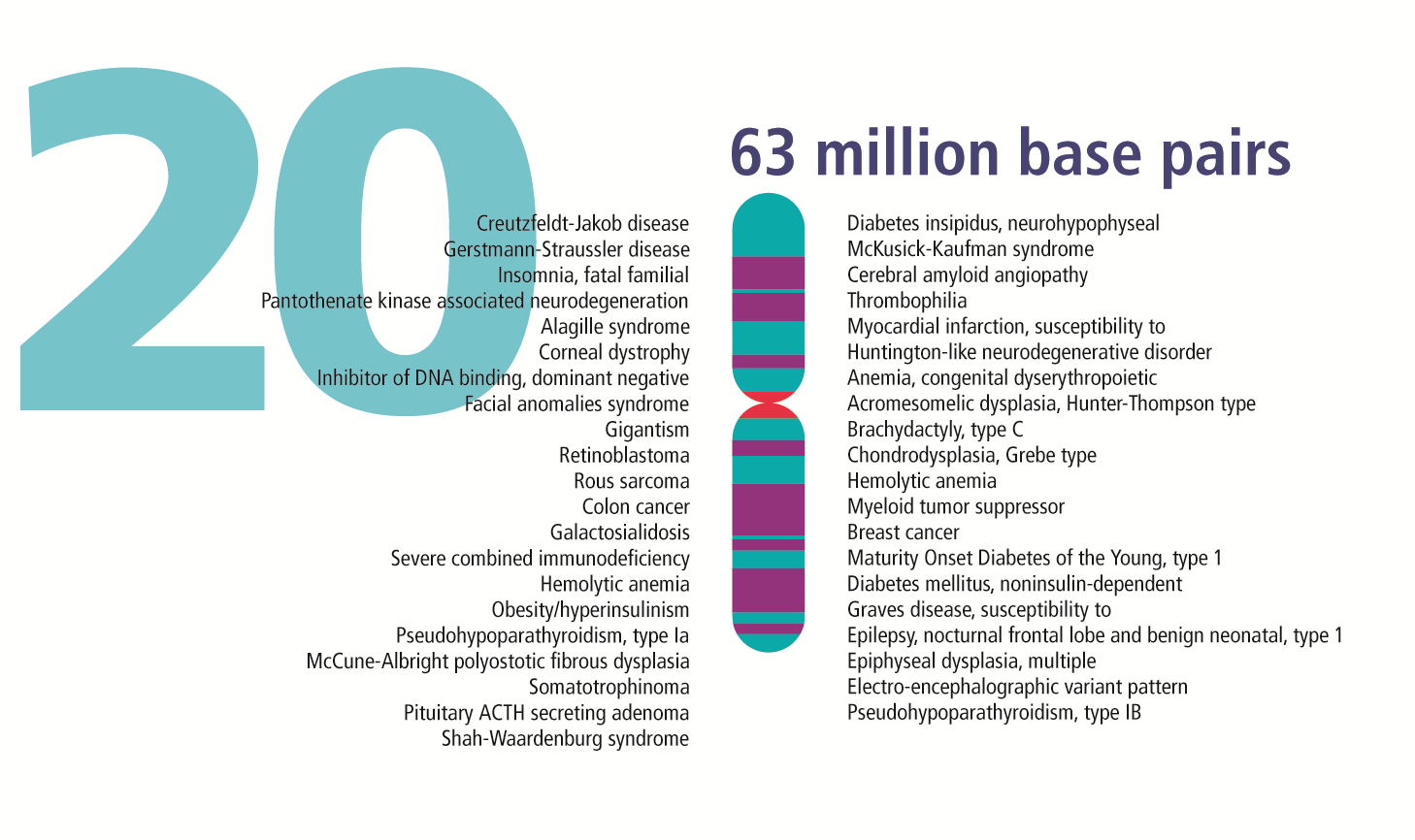

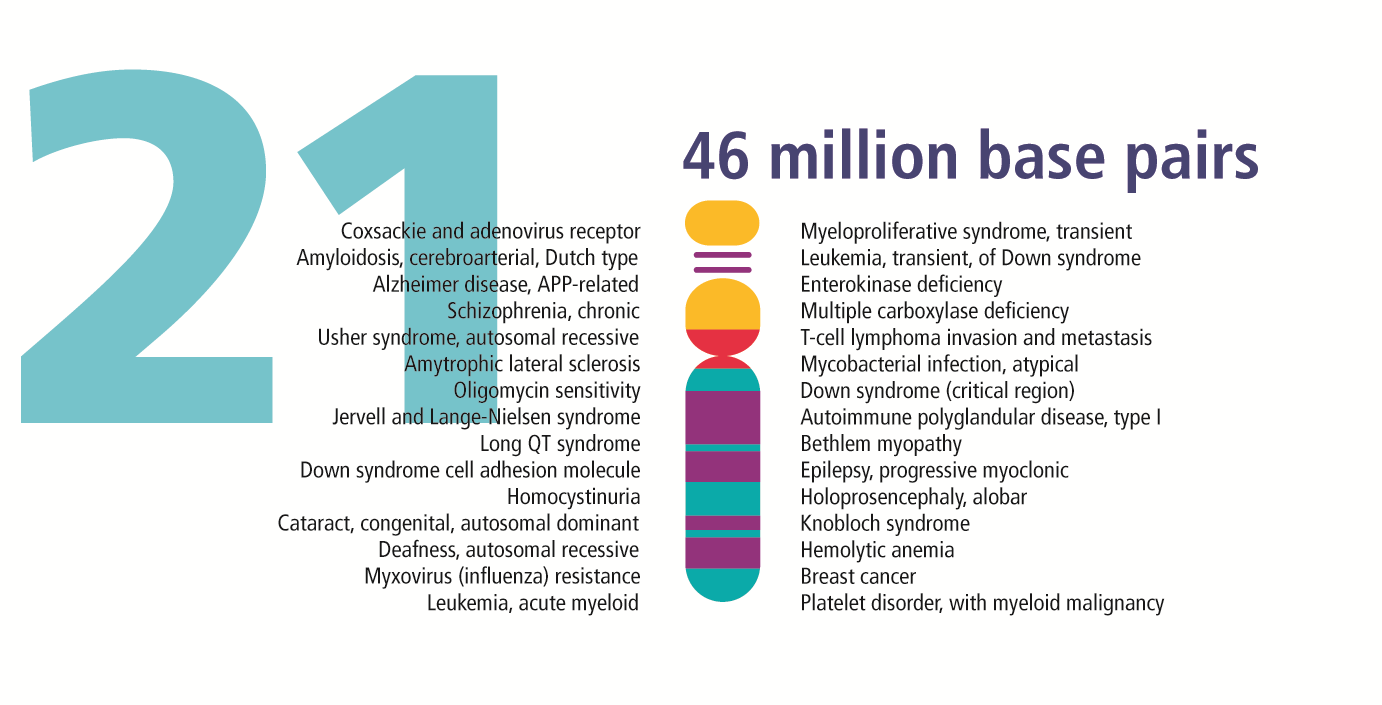

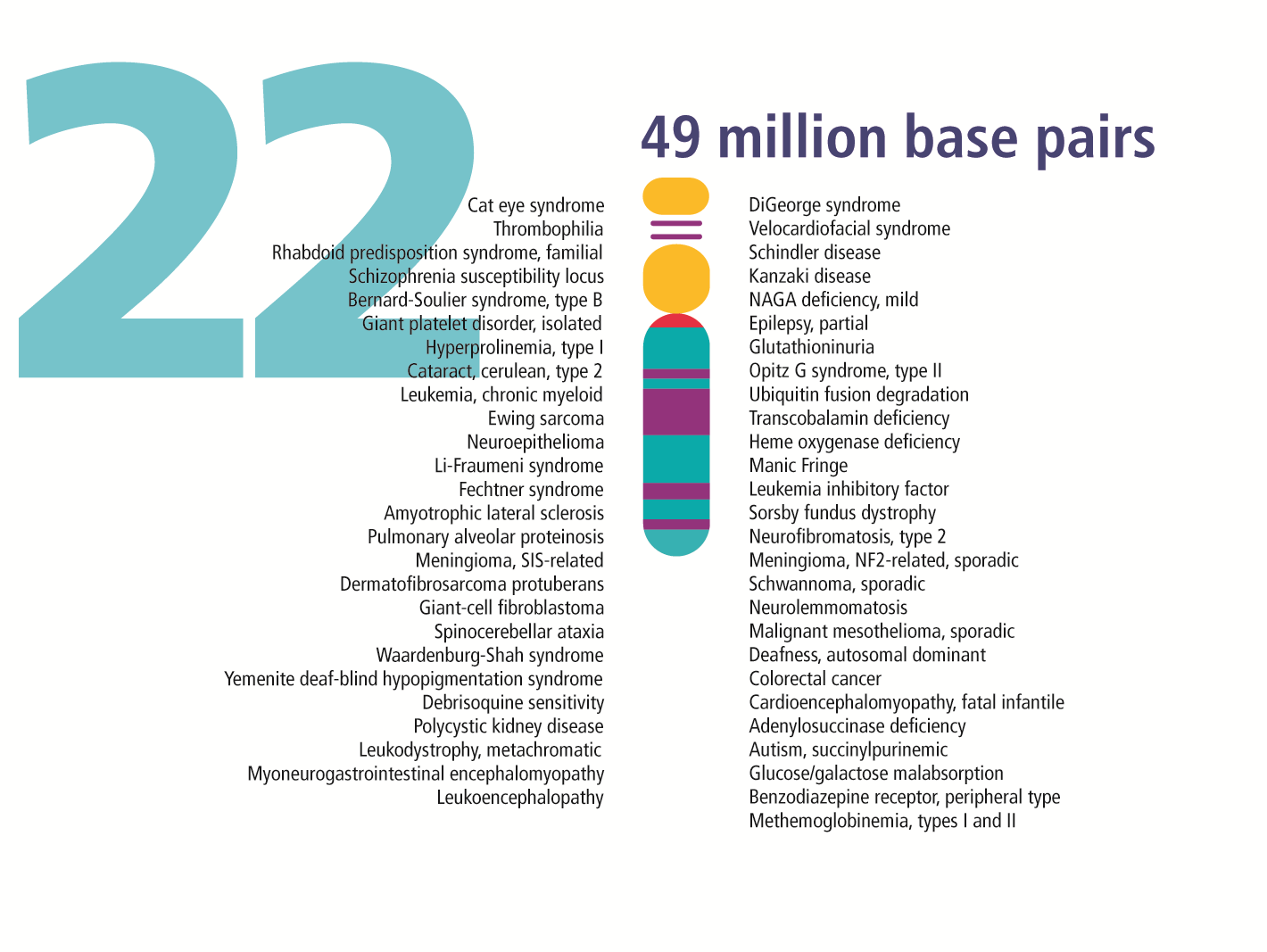

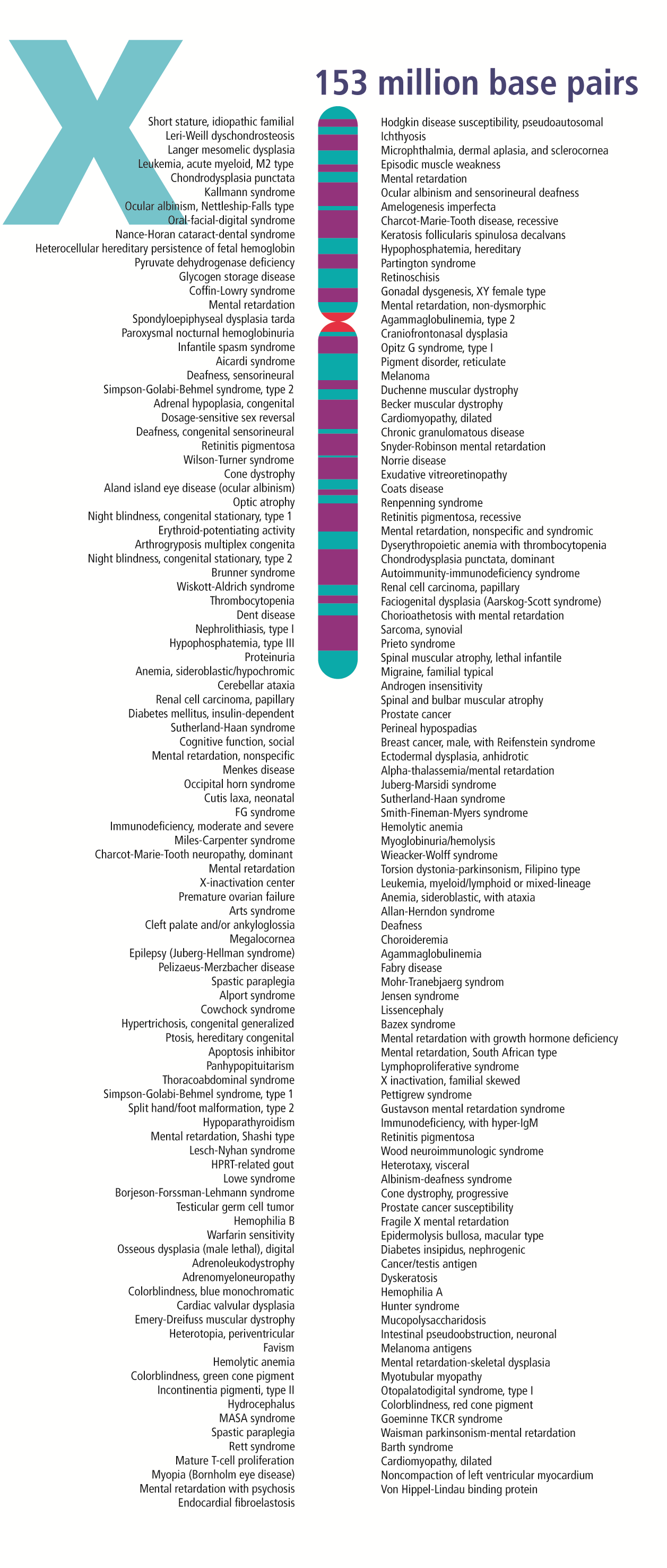

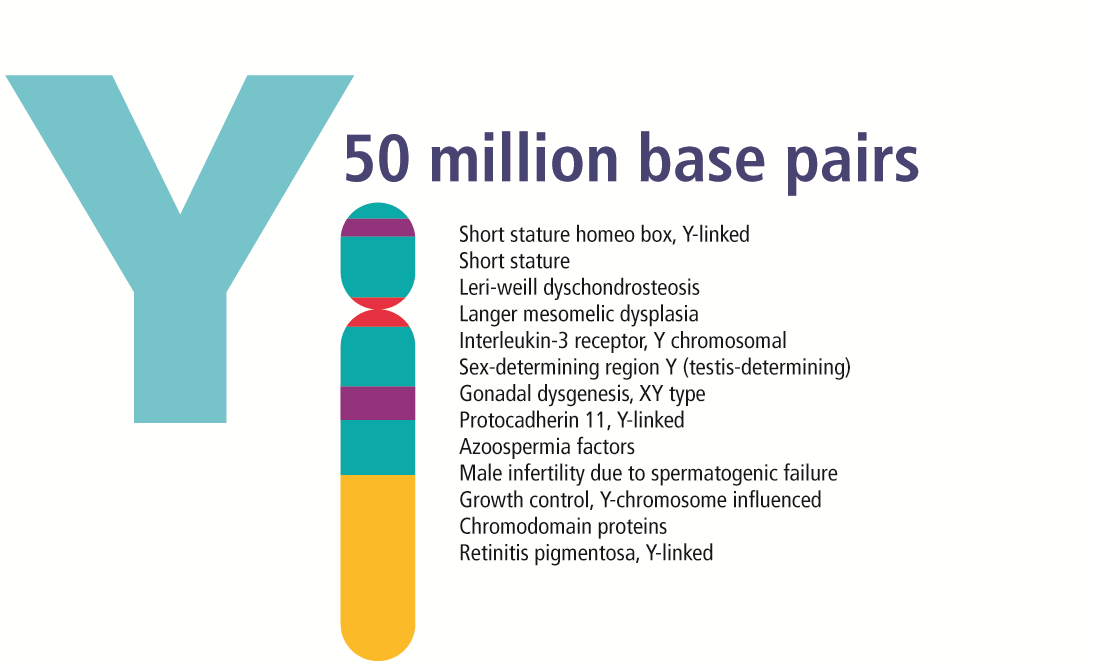

== See also ==
- Chromatin
- Nuclear gene
