= Biopolymer =

Polymer produced by a living organism

Biopolymers are natural polymers produced by the cells of living organisms. Like other polymers, biopolymers consist of monomeric units that are covalently bonded in chains to form larger molecules. There are three main classes of biopolymers, classified according to the monomers used and the structure of the biopolymer formed: polynucleotides, polypeptides, and polysaccharides. The polynucleotides, RNA and DNA, are long polymers of nucleotides. Polypeptides include proteins and shorter polymers of amino acids; some major examples include collagen, actin, and fibrin. Polysaccharides are linear or branched chains of sugar carbohydrates; examples include starch, cellulose, and alginate. Other examples of biopolymers include natural rubbers (polymers of isoprene), suberin and lignin (complex polyphenolic polymers), cutin and cutan (complex polymers of long-chain fatty acids), melanin, and polyhydroxyalkanoates (PHAs).

In addition to their many essential roles in living organisms, biopolymers have applications in many fields including the food industry, manufacturing, packaging, and biomedical engineering.

In the structure of DNA is a pair of biopolymers, polynucleotides, forming the double helix structure

IUPAC definition

biopolymers: Macromolecules (including proteins, nucleic acids and polysaccharides) formed by living organisms.

== Biopolymers versus synthetic polymers ==
A major defining difference between biopolymers and synthetic polymers can be found in their structures. All polymers are made of repetitive units called monomers. Biopolymers often have a well-defined structure, though this is not a defining characteristic (example: lignocellulose): The exact chemical composition and the sequence in which these units are arranged is called the primary structure, in the case of proteins. Many biopolymers spontaneously fold into characteristic compact shapes (see also "protein folding" as well as secondary structure and tertiary structure), which determine their biological functions and depend in a complicated way on their primary structures. Structural biology is the study of the structural properties of biopolymers. In contrast, most synthetic polymers have much simpler and more random (or stochastic) structures. This fact leads to a molecular mass distribution that is missing in biopolymers. In fact, as their synthesis is controlled by a template-directed process in most in vivo systems, all biopolymers of a type (say one specific protein) are all alike: they all contain similar sequences and numbers of monomers and thus all have the same mass. This phenomenon is called monodispersity in contrast to the polydispersity encountered in synthetic polymers. As a result, biopolymers have a dispersity of 1.

== Conventions and nomenclature ==
=== Polypeptides ===
The convention for a polypeptide is to list its constituent amino acid residues as they occur from the amino terminus to the carboxylic acid terminus. The amino acid residues are always joined by peptide bonds. Protein, though used colloquially to refer to any polypeptide, refers to larger or fully functional forms and can consist of several polypeptide chains as well as single chains. Proteins can also be modified to include non-peptide components, such as saccharide chains and lipids.

=== Nucleic acids ===
The convention for a nucleic acid sequence is to list the nucleotides as they occur from the 5' end to the 3' end of the polymer chain, where 5' and 3' refer to the numbering of carbons around the ribose ring which participate in forming the phosphate diester linkages of the chain. Such a sequence is called the primary structure of the biopolymer.

=== Polysaccharides ===
Polysaccharides (sugar polymers) can be linear or branched and are typically joined with glycosidic bonds. The exact placement of the linkage can vary, and the orientation of the linking functional groups is also important, resulting in α- and β-glycosidic bonds with numbering definitive of the linking carbons' location in the ring. In addition, many saccharide units can undergo various chemical modifications, such as amination, and can even form parts of other molecules, such as glycoproteins.

== Structural characterization ==
There are a number of biophysical techniques for determining sequence information. Protein sequence can be determined by Edman degradation, in which the N-terminal residues are hydrolyzed from the chain one at a time, derivatized, and then identified. Mass spectrometer techniques can also be used. Nucleic acid sequence can be determined using gel electrophoresis and capillary electrophoresis. Lastly, mechanical properties of these biopolymers can often be measured using optical tweezers or atomic force microscopy. Dual-polarization interferometry can be used to measure the conformational changes or self-assembly of these materials when stimulated by pH, temperature, ionic strength or other binding partners.

== Common biopolymers ==
Collagen: Collagen is the primary structure of vertebrates and is the most abundant protein in mammals. Because of this, collagen is one of the most easily attainable biopolymers, and used for many research purposes. Because of its mechanical structure, collagen has high tensile strength and is a non-toxic, easily absorbable, biodegradable, and biocompatible material. Therefore, it has been used for many medical applications such as in treatment for tissue infection, drug delivery systems, and gene therapy.

Silk fibroin: Silk Fibroin (SF) is another protein rich biopolymer that can be obtained from different silkworm species, such as the mulberry worm Bombyx mori. In contrast to collagen, SF has a lower tensile strength but has strong adhesive properties due to its insoluble and fibrous protein composition. In recent studies, silk fibroin has been found to possess anticoagulation properties and platelet adhesion. Silk fibroin has been additionally found to support stem cell proliferation in vitro.

Gelatin: Gelatin is obtained from type I collagen consisting of cysteine, and produced by the partial hydrolysis of collagen from bones, tissues and skin of animals. There are two types of gelatin, Type A and Type B. Type A collagen is derived by acid hydrolysis of collagen and has 18.5% nitrogen. Type B is derived by alkaline hydrolysis containing 18% nitrogen and no amide groups. Elevated temperatures cause the gelatin to melts and exists as coils, whereas lower temperatures result in coil to helix transformation. Gelatin contains many functional groups like NH2, SH, and COOH which allow for gelatin to be modified using nanoparticles and biomolecules. Gelatin is an Extracellular Matrix protein which allows it to be applied for applications such as wound dressings, drug delivery and gene transfection.

Starch: Starch is an inexpensive biodegradable biopolymer and copious in supply. Nanofibers and microfibers can be added to the polymer matrix to increase the mechanical properties of starch improving elasticity and strength. Without the fibers, starch has poor mechanical properties due to its sensitivity to moisture. Starch being biodegradable and renewable is used for many applications including plastics and pharmaceutical tablets.

Cellulose: Cellulose is very structured with stacked chains that result in stability and strength. The strength and stability comes from the straighter shape of cellulose caused by glucose monomers joined by glycogen bonds. The straight shape allows the molecules to pack closely. Cellulose is very common in application due to its abundant supply, its biocompatibility, and is environmentally friendly. Cellulose is used vastly in the form of nano-fibrils called nano-cellulose. Nano-cellulose presented at low concentrations produces a transparent gel material. This material can be used for biodegradable, homogeneous, dense films that are very useful in the biomedical field.

Alginate: Alginate is the most copious marine natural polymer derived from brown seaweed. Alginate biopolymer applications range from packaging, textile and food industry to biomedical and chemical engineering. The first ever application of alginate was in the form of wound dressing, where its gel-like and absorbent properties were discovered. When applied to wounds, alginate produces a protective gel layer that is optimal for healing and tissue regeneration, and keeps a stable temperature environment. Additionally, there have been developments with alginate as a drug delivery medium, as drug release rate can easily be manipulated due to a variety of alginate densities and fibrous composition.

== Biopolymer applications ==
The applications of biopolymers can be categorized under two main fields, which differ due to their biomedical and industrial use.

=== Biomedical ===
Because one of the main purposes for biomedical engineering is to mimic body parts to sustain normal body functions, due to their biocompatible properties, biopolymers are used vastly for tissue engineering, medical devices and the pharmaceutical industry. Many biopolymers can be used for regenerative medicine, tissue engineering, drug delivery, and overall medical applications due to their mechanical properties. They provide characteristics like wound healing, and catalysis of bioactivity, and non-toxicity. Compared to synthetic polymers, which can present various disadvantages like immunogenic rejection and toxicity after degradation, many biopolymers are normally better with bodily integration as they also possess more complex structures, similar to the human body.

More specifically, polypeptides like collagen and silk, are biocompatible materials that are being used in ground-breaking research, as these are inexpensive and easily attainable materials. Gelatin polymer is often used on dressing wounds where it acts as an adhesive. Scaffolds and films with gelatin allow for the scaffolds to hold drugs and other nutrients that can be used to supply to a wound for healing.

As collagen is one of the more popular biopolymers used in biomedical science, here are some examples of their use:

Collagen based drug delivery systems: collagen films act like a barrier membrane and are used to treat tissue infections like infected corneal tissue or liver cancer. Collagen films have all been used for gene delivery carriers which can promote bone formation.

Collagen sponges: Collagen sponges are used as a dressing to treat burn victims and other serious wounds. Collagen based implants are used for cultured skin cells or drug carriers that are used for burn wounds and replacing skin.

Collagen as haemostat: When collagen interacts with platelets it causes a rapid coagulation of blood. This rapid coagulation produces a temporary framework so the fibrous stroma can be regenerated by host cells. Collagen based haemostat reduces blood loss in tissues and helps manage bleeding in organs such as the liver and spleen.

Chitosan is another popular biopolymer in biomedical research. Chitosan is derived from chitin, the main component in the exoskeleton of crustaceans and insects and the second most abundant biopolymer in the world. Chitosan has many excellent characteristics for biomedical science. Chitosan is biocompatible, it is highly bioactive, meaning it stimulates a beneficial response from the body, it can biodegrade which can eliminate a second surgery in implant applications, can form gels and films, and is selectively permeable. These properties allow for various biomedical applications of chitosan.

Chitosan as drug delivery: Chitosan is used mainly with drug targeting because it has potential to improve drug absorption and stability. In addition, chitosan conjugated with anticancer agents can also produce better anticancer effects by causing gradual release of free drug into cancerous tissue.

Chitosan as an anti-microbial agent: Chitosan is used to stop the growth of microorganisms. It performs antimicrobial functions in microorganisms like algae, fungi, bacteria, and gram-positive bacteria of different yeast species.

Chitosan composite for tissue engineering: Chitosan powder blended with alginate is used to form functional wound dressings. These dressings create a moist, biocompatible environment which aids in the healing process. This wound dressing is also biodegradable and has porous structures that allows cells to grow into the dressing. Furthermore, thiolated chitosans (see thiomers) are used for tissue engineering and wound healing, as these biopolymers are able to crosslink via disulfide bonds forming stable three-dimensional networks.

=== Industrial ===
Food: Biopolymers are being used in the food industry for things like packaging, edible encapsulation films and coating foods. Polylactic acid (PLA) is very common in the food industry due to is clear color and resistance to water. However, most polymers have a hydrophilic nature and start deteriorating when exposed to moisture. Biopolymers are also being used as edible films that encapsulate foods. These films can carry things like antioxidants, enzymes, probiotics, minerals, and vitamins. The food consumed encapsulated with the biopolymer film can supply these things to the body.

Packaging: The most common biopolymers used in packaging are polyhydroxyalkanoates (PHAs), polylactic acid (PLA), and starch. Starch and PLA are commercially available and biodegradable, making them a common choice for packaging. However, their barrier properties (either moisture-barrier or gas-barrier properties) and thermal properties are not ideal. Hydrophilic polymers are not water resistant and allow water to get through the packaging which can affect the contents of the package. Polyglycolic acid (PGA) is a biopolymer that has great barrier characteristics and is now being used to correct the barrier obstacles from PLA and starch.

Water purification: Chitosan has been used for water purification. It is used as a flocculant that only takes a few weeks or months rather than years to degrade in the environment. Chitosan purifies water by chelation. This is the process in which binding sites along the polymer chain bind with the metal ions in the water forming chelates. Chitosan has been shown to be an excellent candidate for use in storm and wastewater treatment.

== As materials ==
Some biopolymers- such as PLA, naturally occurring zein, and poly-3-hydroxybutyrate can be used as plastics, replacing the need for polystyrene or polyethylene based plastics.

Some plastics are now referred to as being 'degradable', 'oxy-degradable' or 'UV-degradable'. This means that they break down when exposed to light or air, but these plastics are still primarily (as much as 98 per cent) oil-based and are not currently certified as 'biodegradable' under the European Union directive on Packaging and Packaging Waste (94/62/EC). Biopolymers will break down, and some are suitable for domestic composting.

Biopolymers (also called renewable polymers) are produced from biomass for use in the packaging industry. Biomass comes from crops such as sugar beet, potatoes, or wheat: when used to produce biopolymers, these are classified as non food crops. These can be converted in the following pathways:

Sugar beet > Glyconic acid > Polyglyconic acid

Starch > (fermentation) > Lactic acid > Polylactic acid (PLA)

Biomass > (fermentation) > Bioethanol > Ethene > Polyethylene

Many types of packaging can be made from biopolymers: food trays, blown starch pellets for shipping fragile goods, thin films for wrapping.

=== Environmental impacts ===
Biopolymers can be sustainable, carbon neutral and are always renewable, because they are made from plant or animal materials which can be grown indefinitely. Since these materials come from agricultural crops, their use could create a sustainable industry. In contrast, the feedstocks for polymers derived from petrochemicals will eventually deplete. In addition, biopolymers have the potential to cut carbon emissions and reduce CO_{2} quantities in the atmosphere: this is because the CO_{2} released when they degrade can be reabsorbed by crops grown to replace them: this makes them close to carbon neutral.

Almost all biopolymers are biodegradable in the natural environment: they are broken down into CO_{2} and water by microorganisms. These biodegradable biopolymers are also compostable: they can be put into an industrial composting process and will break down by 90% within six months. Biopolymers that do this can be marked with a 'compostable' symbol, under European Standard EN 13432 (2000). Packaging marked with this symbol can be put into industrial composting processes and will break down within six months or less. An example of a compostable polymer is PLA film under 20μm thick: films which are thicker than that do not qualify as compostable, even though they are "biodegradable". In Europe there is a home composting standard and associated logo that enables consumers to identify and dispose of packaging in their compost heap.

== See also ==
- Biomaterials
- Bioplastic
- Biopolymers & Cell (journal)
- Condensation polymers
- Condensed tannins
- DNA sequence
- Food microbiology § Microbial biopolymers
- Melanin
- Non food crops
- Phosphoramidite
- Polymer chemistry
- Sequence-controlled polymers
- Sequencing
- Small molecules
- Worm-like chain
- Polyoxazolines
