= Biopolymers & Cell =

Biopolymers and Cell (Biopolym. Cell) is a scientific journal issued by the National Academy of Sciences of Ukraine and Institute of Molecular Biology and Genetics of NASU. It was established in January 1985, and its ISSN numbers are ISSN 0233-7657 for the print version and ISSN 1993-6842 for the online version.

The journal publishes original contributions in molecular biology and related areas:

- Structure and function of biopolymers in different cells at different conditions;
- Genome regulation;
- Molecular mechanisms of differentiation;
- Oncogenesis;
- Cell-virus interaction;
- Biotechnology;
- Bioorganic chemistry;
- Drug design;
- Biology of peptides, nucleoside derivatives and modified oligonucleotides

Biopolym. Cell is issued bimonthly, with one volume per year. All articles have digital object identifiers (DOI). The format of Biopolym. Cell corresponds to international standards. The journal provides rapid free open access to publications. Since 2014 the articles are published in English.

Biopolymers and Cell is indexed and/or abstracted in: Scopus, SJR, Index Copernicus, BIOSIS Previews, elibrary.ru, Medical Journal Links, referative journals "Dzherelo" (Ukraine) and VINITI Database RAS, EBSCO, HINARI, Russian index of scientific citations. This journal has been included in the HAC of Ukraine (Higher Attestation (Certification) Commission) list according to following subjects (topics): biology, chemistry

Editor-in-chief: Prof. Gennady Kh. Matsuka, the founder of Biopolymers and Cell was a director of [Institute of Molecular Biology and Genetics]. He was succeeded as editor-in-chief in 2003 by prof. Anna V. El'skaya. The Biopolymers and Cell Editorial Board is composed of prominent international scientists.
