= Side chain =

Chemical group attached to backbone

IUPAC definition

Branch
Side-chain
Pendant chain
An oligomeric or polymeric offshoot from a macromolecular chain.

Notes

1. An oligomeric branch may be termed a short-chain branch.
2. A polymeric branch may be termed a long-chain branch.

In organic chemistry and biochemistry, a side chain or pendant chain (not to be confused with pendant group or side group) is a chemical group that is attached to a core part of the molecule called the "main chain" or backbone. It is one factor in determining a molecule's properties and reactivity.

== Conventions ==
A L-amino acid, with the R-group used as a placeholder for a side chain.

The placeholder R is often used as a generic placeholder for side chains in structural formulae (see R group (chemistry)). Otherwise, X, Y, or Z are often used, X particularly for halogens.

== History ==
The R symbol was introduced by 19th-century French chemist Charles Frédéric Gerhardt, who advocated its adoption on the grounds that it would be widely recognizable and intelligible given its correspondence in multiple European languages to the initial letter of "root" or "residue": French racine ("root") and résidu ("residue"), these terms' respective English translations along with radical (itself derived from Latin radix below), Latin radix ("root") and residuum ("residue"), and German Rest ("remnant" and, in the context of chemistry, both "residue" and "radical").

== Usage ==
=== Organic chemistry ===
In polymer science, the side chain of an oligomeric or polymeric offshoot extends from the backbone chain of a polymer. Side chains have noteworthy influence on a polymer's properties, mainly its crystallinity and density. An oligomeric branch may be termed a short-chain branch, and a polymeric branch may be termed a long-chain branch. Side groups are different from side chains; they are neither oligomeric nor polymeric.

=== Biochemistry ===
In proteins, which are composed of amino acid residues, the side chains are attached to the alpha-carbon atoms of the amide backbone. The side chain connected to the alpha-carbon is specific for each amino acid and is responsible for determining properties such as charge and polarity, that then are responsible for many of the interactions which lead to proper protein folding and function. Spatial positions of side-chain atoms can be predicted based on protein backbone geometry using computational tools for side-chain reconstruction.

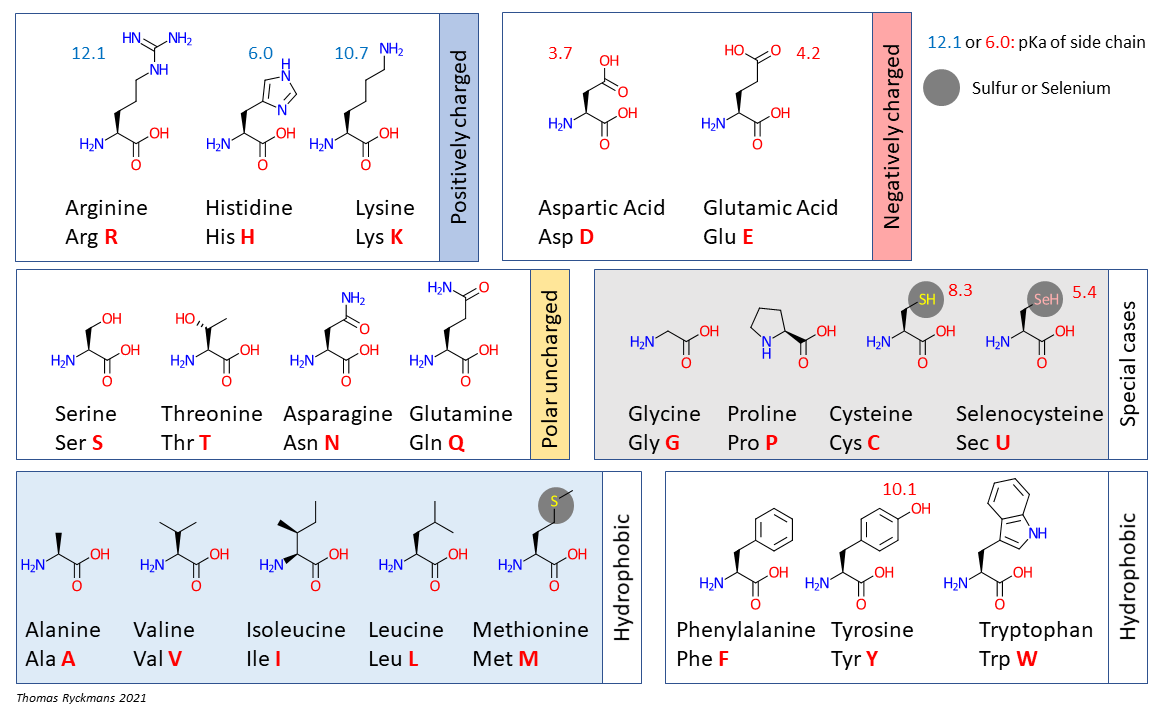
A table of the proteinogenic amino acid side chains, which would replace the R-group placeholder.

== See also ==
- Alkyl
- Backbone-dependent rotamer library
- Backbone chain
- Branching (polymer chemistry)
- Functional group
- Pendant group
- Residue (chemistry)
- R group (chemistry)
- Substituent
