= NASU Institute of Molecular Biology and Genetics =

Soviet-Russian research organization

The Institute of Molecular Biology and Genetics of the National Academy of Sciences of Ukraine (IMBG of the NASU) is a scientific research organisation in Kyiv, Ukraine. Founded in 1973 as a branch of the National Academy of Sciences of Ukraine, the institute specialises in genomics, proteomics, bioinformatics, genetic engineering and cellular engineering.
