= Friedrich Walchner =

German geologist, chemist and mineralogist (1799–1865)

Friedrich August Walchner
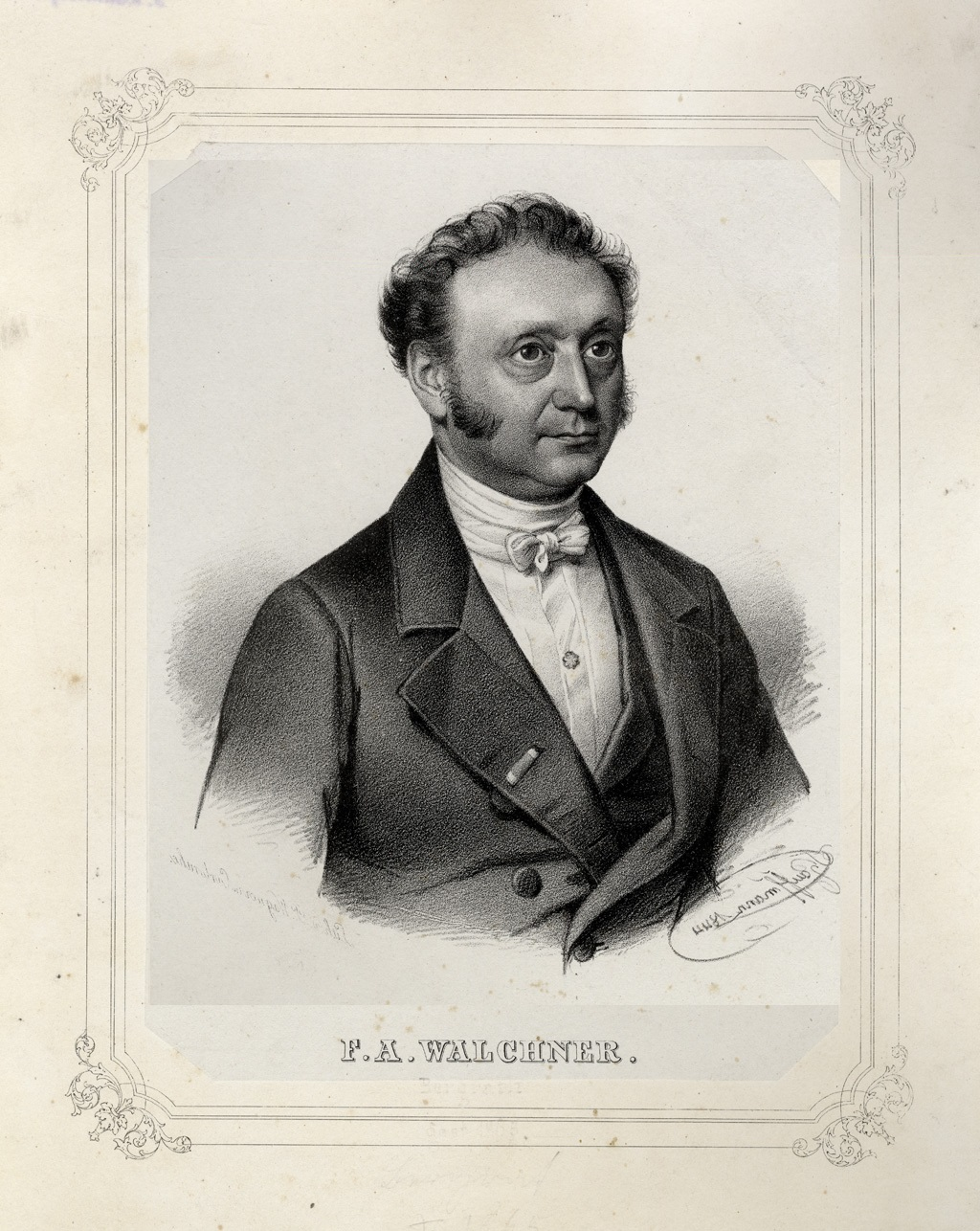
- Friedrich Walchner in 1844.
- Born: 2 September 1799; Meersburg, Holy Roman Empire
- Died: 17 February 1865; Karslruhe, Germany
- Occupation(s): German geologist, chemist and mineralogist

Friedrich August Walchner (2 September 1799 – 17 February 1865) was a German geologist, chemist and mineralogist.

== Life ==
Walchner was born in Meersburg. He studied in Göttingen and at the Albert Ludwig University of Freiburg. In 1817 he joined the Corps Rhenania Freiburg. In Freiburg he was member of the Burschenschaft Genossenschaft/Verein zur Bearbeitung wissenschaftlicher Gegenstände (Union cooperative / Association for processing scientific objects) and by the year 1818 he was member of the Alten Freiburger Burschenschaft (Old Freiburg fraternity). In Freiburg he habilitated in 1823 and became a private lecturer and associate professor. In 1825 he was appointed to professor in mineralogy, geology and chemistry at the then newly founded Polytechnic School Karlsruhe, where he was one of the twelve lecturers at the time of founding. From 1833 to 1836 he held the post of rector there.

He was appointed to the Directorate of Forestry and Mining in the Grand Duchy of Baden. He retired in 1855 and died in Karlsruhe in 1865.

== Works ==
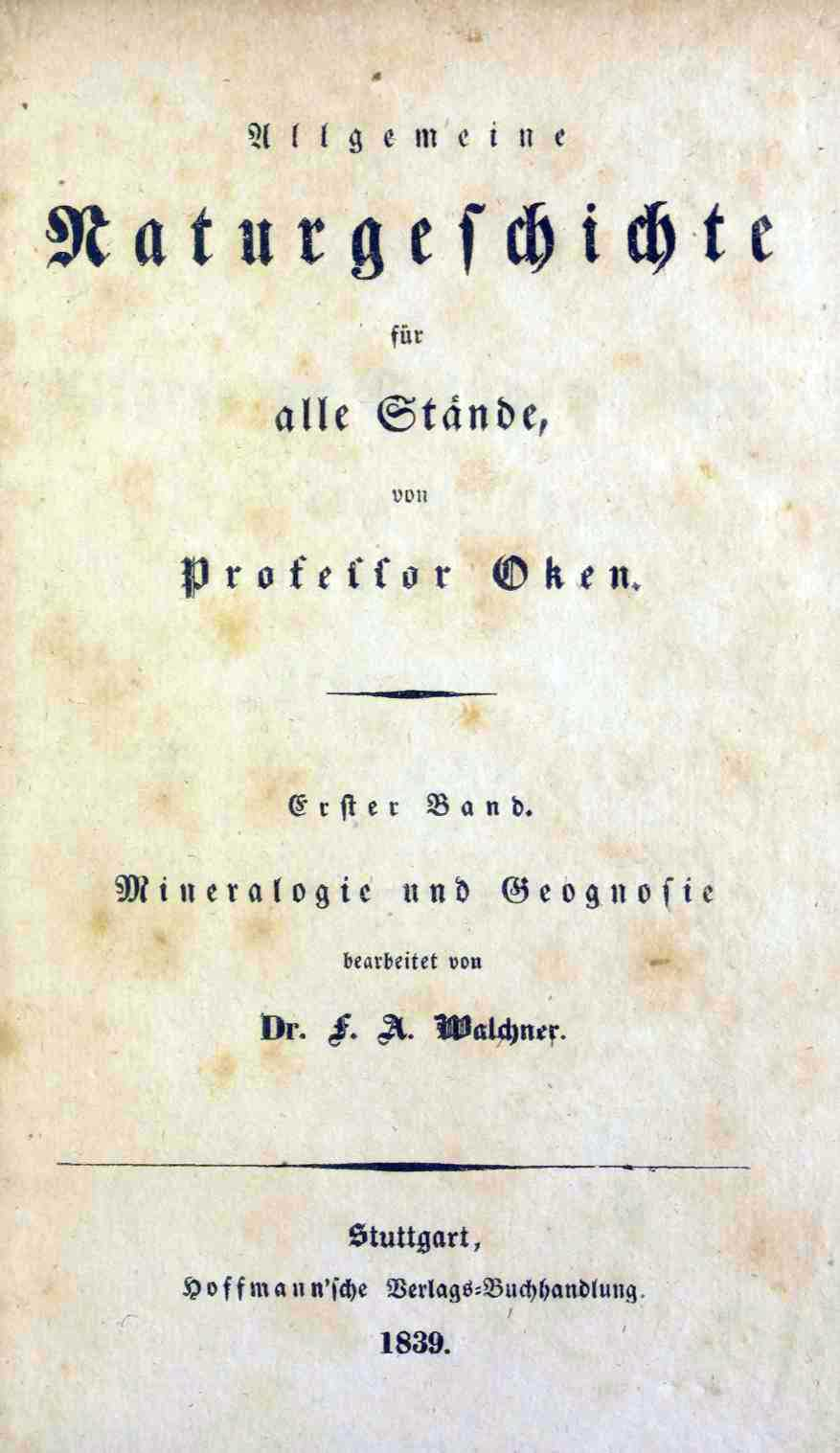
Mineralogie und Geognosie, 1839

- Friedrich August Walchner (1832-1833). Handbuch der Mineralogie und Geognosie. (also published in Lorenz Oken (1833–1841): Allgemeine Naturgeschichte für alle Stände, Teil 1. Stuttgart).
- Mineralogie und Geognosie (in French). Stüttgart: Hoffmann. 1839.
- Friedrich August Walchner (1849). Lehrbuch der unorganischen Chemie.
- Friedrich August Walchner (1849). Darstellung der geologischen Verhältnisse der am Nordrande des Schwarzwaldes hervortretenden Mineralquellen.
- Friedrich August Walchner (1851). Handbuch der Geognosie.
