= Polynucleotide =

Biopolymer molecule composed of nucleotide monomers

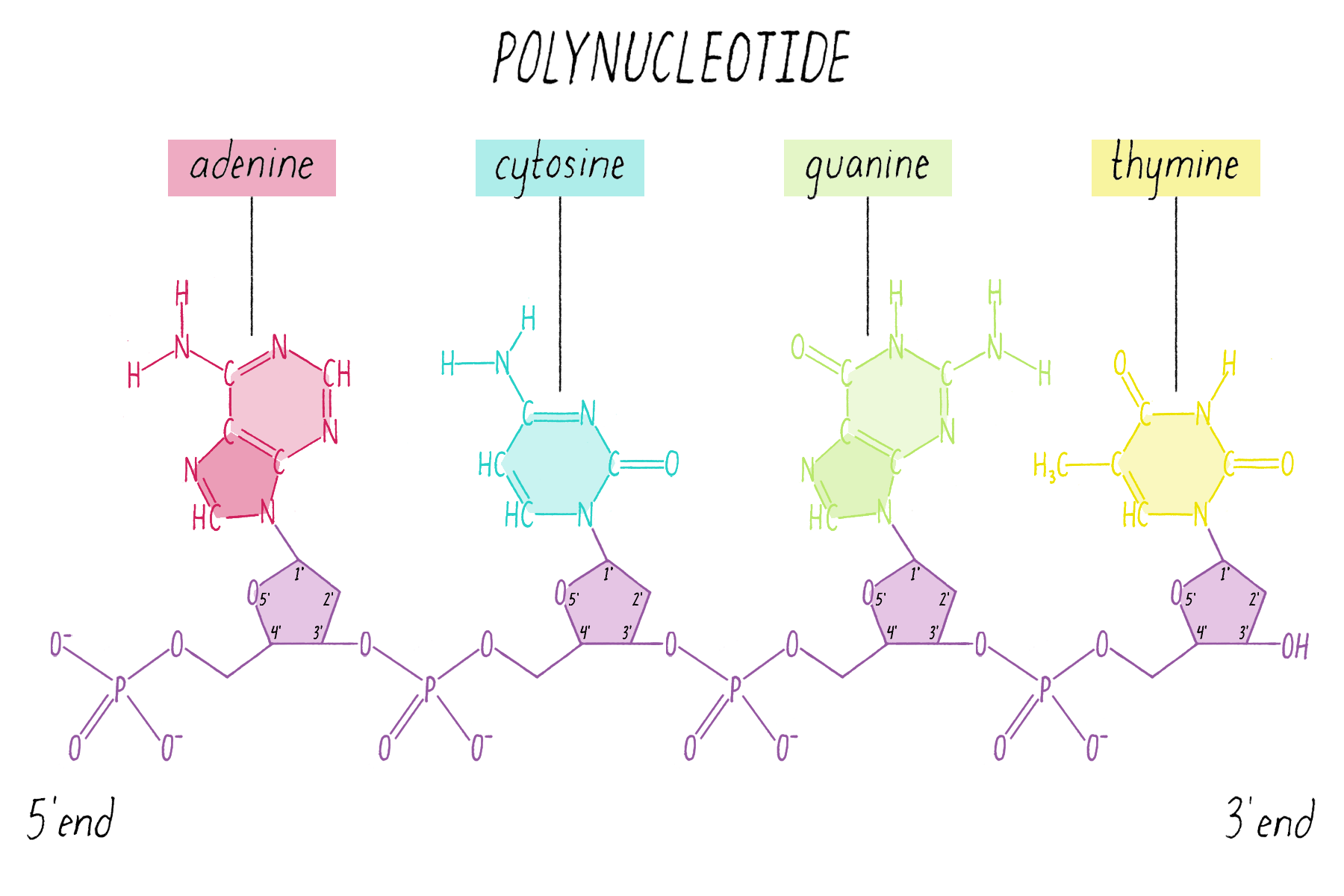
A series of nucleotides joined together by covalent phosphodiester bonds. DNA and RNA are polynucleotides.

In molecular biology, a polynucleotide (from Ancient Greek πολυς (polys) 'many') is a biopolymer composed of nucleotide monomers that are covalently bonded in a chain. DNA (deoxyribonucleic acid) and RNA (ribonucleic acid) are examples of polynucleotides with distinct biological functions. DNA consists of two chains of polynucleotides, with each chain in the form of a helix (like a spiral staircase).

== Sequence ==
Although DNA and RNA do not generally occur in the same polynucleotide, the four species of nucleotides may occur in any order in the chain. The sequence of DNA or RNA species for a given polynucleotide is the main factor determining its function in a living organism or a scientific experiment.

== Polynucleotides in organisms ==
Polynucleotides occur naturally in all living organisms. The genome of an organism consists of complementary pairs of enormously long polynucleotides wound around each other in the form of a double helix. Polynucleotides have a variety of other roles in organisms.

== Polynucleotides in scientific experiments ==
Polynucleotides are used in biochemical experiments such as polymerase chain reaction (PCR) or DNA sequencing. Polynucleotides are made artificially from oligonucleotides, smaller nucleotide chains with generally fewer than 30 subunits. A polymerase enzyme is used to extend the chain by adding nucleotides according to a pattern specified by the scientist.

== Prebiotic condensation of nucleobases with ribose ==
In order to understand how life arose, knowledge is required of the chemical pathways that permit formation of the key building blocks of life under plausible prebiotic conditions. According to the RNA world hypothesis free-floating ribonucleotides were present in the primitive soup. These were the fundamental molecules that combined in series to form RNA. Molecules as complex as RNA must have arisen from small molecules whose reactivity was governed by physico-chemical processes. RNA is composed of purine and pyrimidine nucleotides, both of which are necessary for reliable information transfer, and thus Darwinian natural selection and evolution. Nam et al. demonstrated the direct condensation of nucleobases with ribose to give ribonucleosides in aqueous microdroplets, a key step leading to RNA formation. Similar results were obtained using wet-dry cycles by Becker et al.

== Medical use ==
Fish derived polynucleotide is used in aesthetic medicine as a dermal filler. It has also been found effective in alleviating knee osteoarthritic pain.
