= Polymer backbone =

Longest chain of covalently-bonded atoms in a polymer

IUPAC definition

Main chain or Backbone
That linear chain to which all other chains, long or short or both,
may be regarded as being pendant.

Note: Where two or more chains
could equally be considered to be the main chain, that one is
selected which leads to the simplest representation of the
molecule.

In polymer science, the polymer chain or simply backbone of a polymer is the main chain of a polymer. Polymers are often classified according to the elements in the main chains. The character of the backbone, i.e. its flexibility, determines the properties of the polymer (such as the glass transition temperature). For example, in polysiloxanes (silicone), the backbone chain is very flexible, which results in a very low glass transition temperature of −123 °C (−189 °F; 150 K). The polymers with rigid backbones are prone to crystallization (e.g. polythiophenes) in thin films and in solution. Crystallization in its turn affects the optical properties of the polymers, its optical band gap and electronic levels.

== Organic polymers ==
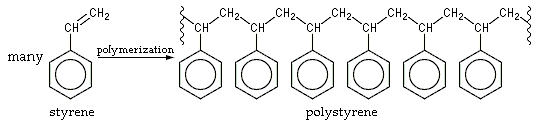
Formation of polystyrene, a polymer with an organic backbone.

Common synthetic polymers have main chains composed of carbon, i.e. C-C-C-C.... Examples include polyolefins such as polyethylene ((CH_{2}CH_{2})_{n}) and many substituted derivative ((CH_{2}CH(R))_{n}) such as polystyrene (R = C_{6}H_{5}), polypropylene (R = CH_{3}), and acrylates (R = CO_{2}R').

Other major classes of organic polymers are polyesters and polyamides. They have respectively -C(O)-O- and -C(O)-NH- groups in their backbones in addition to chains of carbon. Major commercial products are polyethyleneterephthalate ("PET"), ((C_{6}H_{4}CO_{2}C_{2}H_{4}OC(O))_{n}) and nylon-6 ((NH(CH_{2})_{5}C(O))_{n}).

== Inorganic polymers ==
Polydimethylsiloxane is classified as an "inorganic polymer", because the backbone lacks carbon.

Siloxanes are a premier example of an inorganic polymer, even though they have extensive organic substituents. Their backbond is composed of alternating silicon and oxygen atoms, i.e. Si-O-Si-O... The silicon atoms bear two substituents, usually methyl as in the case of polydimethylsiloxane. Some uncommon but illustrative inorganic polymers include polythiazyl ((SN)x) with alternating S and N atoms, and polyphosphates ((PO_{3}^{−})_{n}).

== Biopolymers ==
Major families of biopolymers are polysaccharides (carbohydrates), peptides, and polynucleotides. Many variants of each are known.

=== Proteins and peptides ===
A simplified example of condensation showing the alpha and beta classification. Glucose and fructose form sucrose. The synthesis of glycogen in the body is driven by the enzyme glycogen synthase which uses a uridine diphosphate (UDP) leaving group.

Proteins are characterized by amide linkages (-N(H)-C(O)-) formed by the condensation of amino acids. The sequence of the amino acids in the polypeptide backbone is known as the primary structure of the protein. Like almost all polymers, protein fold and twist, forming into the secondary structure, which is rigidified by hydrogen bonding between the carbonyl oxygens and amide hydrogens in the backbone, i.e. C=O---HN. Further interactions between residues of the individual amino acids form the protein's tertiary structure. For this reason, the primary structure of the amino acids in the polypeptide backbone is the map of the final structure of a protein, and it therefore indicates its biological function. Spatial positions of backbone atoms can be reconstructed from the positions of alpha carbons using computational tools for the backbone reconstruction.

=== Carbohydrates ===
Condensation of adenine and guanine forming a phosphodiester bond, the triphosphorylated ribose of the incoming nucleotide is attacked by the 3' hydroxyl of the polymer, releasing pyrophosphate.

Carbohydrates arise by condensation of monosaccharides such as glucose. The polymers can be classified into oligosaccharides (up to 10 residues) and polysaccharides (up to about 50,000 residues). The backbone chain is characterized by an ether bond between individual monosaccharides. This bond is called the glycosidic linkage. These backbone chains can be unbranched (containing one linear chain) or branched (containing multiple chains). The glycosidic linkages are designated as alpha or beta depending on the relative stereochemistry of the anomeric (or most oxidized) carbon. In a Fischer Projection, if the glycosidic linkage is on the same side or face as carbon 6 of a common biological saccharide, the carbohydrate is designated as beta and if the linkage is on the opposite side it is designated as alpha. In a traditional "chair structure" projection, if the linkage is on the same plane (equatorial or axial) as carbon 6 it is designated as beta and on the opposite plane it is designated as alpha. This is exemplified in sucrose (table sugar) which contains a linkage that is alpha to glucose and beta to fructose. Generally, carbohydrates which our bodies break down are alpha-linked (example: glycogen) and those which have structural function are beta-linked (example: cellulose).

=== Nucleic acids ===
Deoxyribonucleic acid (DNA) and ribonucleic acid (RNA) are the main examples of polynucleotides. They arise by condensation of nucleotides. Their backbones form by the condensation of a hydroxy group on a ribose with the phosphate group on another ribose. This linkage is called a phosphodiester bond. The condensation is catalyzed by enzymes called polymerases. DNA and RNA can be millions of nucleotides long thus allowing for the genetic diversity of life. The bases project from the pentose-phosphate polymer backbone and are hydrogen bonded in pairs to their complementary partners (A with T and G with C). This creates a double helix with pentose phosphate backbones on either side, thus forming a secondary structure.

== See also ==
- Pendant group
- Peptide
