= Pendant group =

Group of atoms attached to a long molecule's backbone chain

IUPAC definition

Pendant group
Side-group
An offshoot, neither oligomeric nor polymeric, from a chain.

In IUPAC nomenclature of chemistry, a pendant group (sometimes spelled pendent) or side group is a group of atoms attached to a backbone chain of a long molecule, usually a polymer. Pendant groups are different from pendant chains, as they are neither oligomeric nor polymeric.

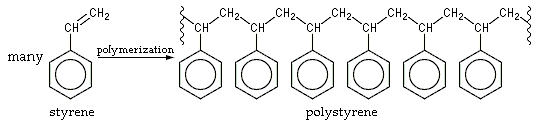

For example, the phenyl groups are the pendant groups on a polystyrene chain.

Large, bulky pendant groups such as adamantyl usually raise the glass transition temperature (T_{g}) of a polymer by preventing the chains from sliding past each other easily. Short alkyl pendant groups may lower the T_{g} by a lubricant effect.
