= Vladimir Prelog =

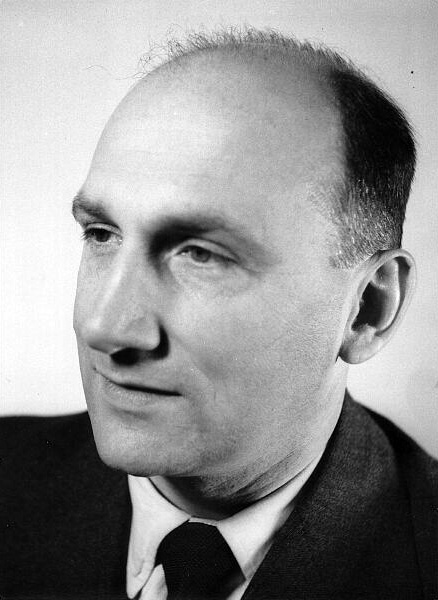
- Born: 23 July 1906; Sarajevo, Condominium of Bosnia and Herzegovina, Austria-Hungary
- Died: 7 January 1998 (aged 91); Zürich, Switzerland
- Education: Czech Technical University in Prague (Sc.D, 1929)
- Known for: Organic chemistry; Biochemistry; Conformational analysis; Cahn–Ingold–Prelog priority rules; Prelog strain; Klyne–Prelog system; Prelog's rule; Prelog–Djerassi lactone
- Spouse: Kamila Vitek (m. 1933)
- Awards: Centenary Prize (1949); ForMemRS (1962); Marcel Benoist Prize (1964); Davy Medal (1967); Paul Karrer Gold Medal (1974); Nobel Prize for Chemistry (1975); Chirality Medal (1992)
- Scientific career
- Fields: Biochemistry
- Workplaces: Czech Institute of Technology; University of Zagreb; ETH Zürich
- Doctoral advisor: Emil Votoček

Vladimir Prelog ForMemRS (23 July 1906 – 7 January 1998) was a Croatian-Swiss organic chemist who received the 1975 Nobel Prize in chemistry for his research into the stereochemistry of organic molecules and reactions. Prelog was born, and spent his infancy, in Sarajevo, and youth in Zagreb, Osijek and Prague. He later lived and worked in Prague, Zagreb and Zürich.

== Early life ==
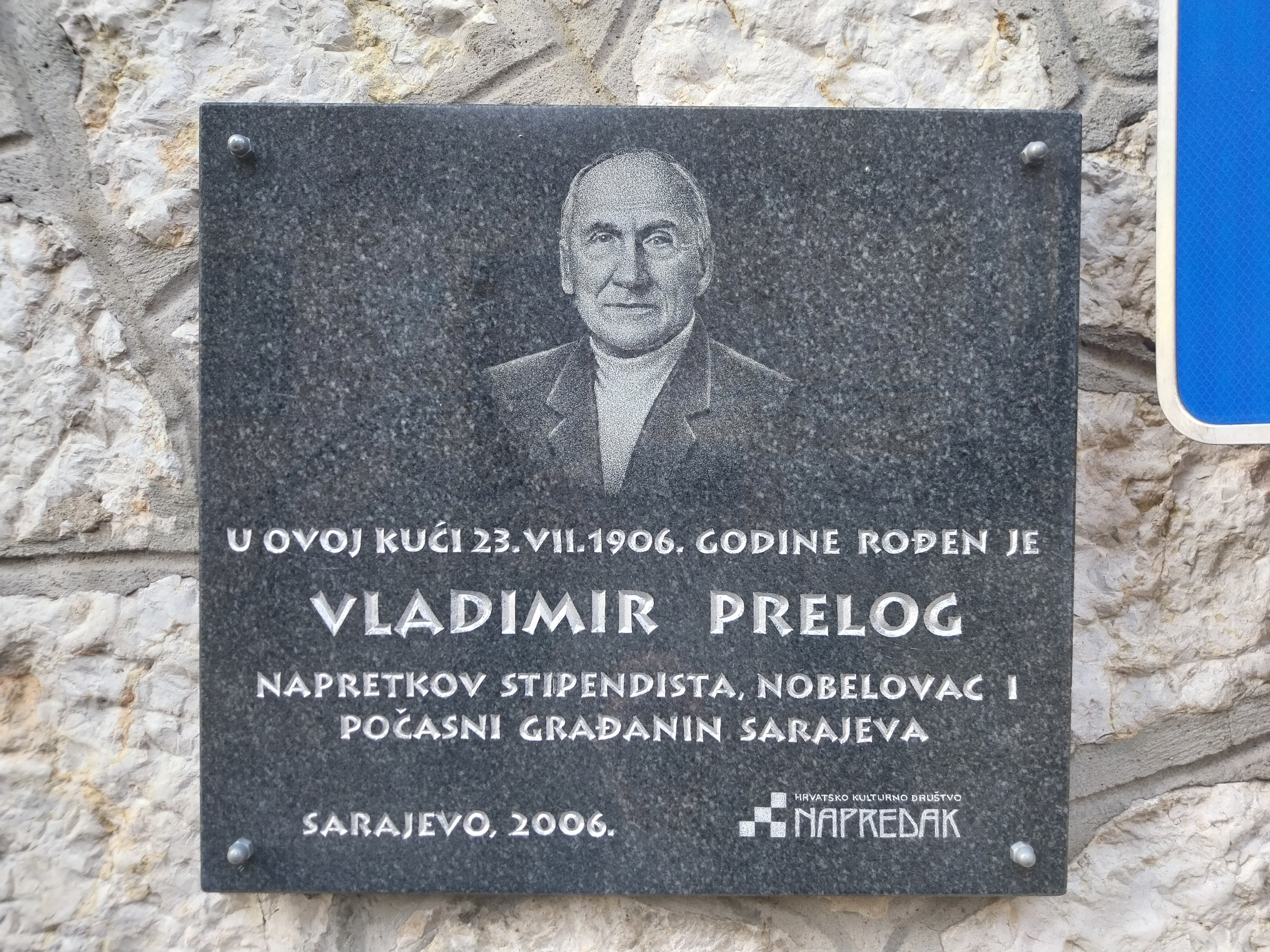
The house in Sarajevo which Prelog was born

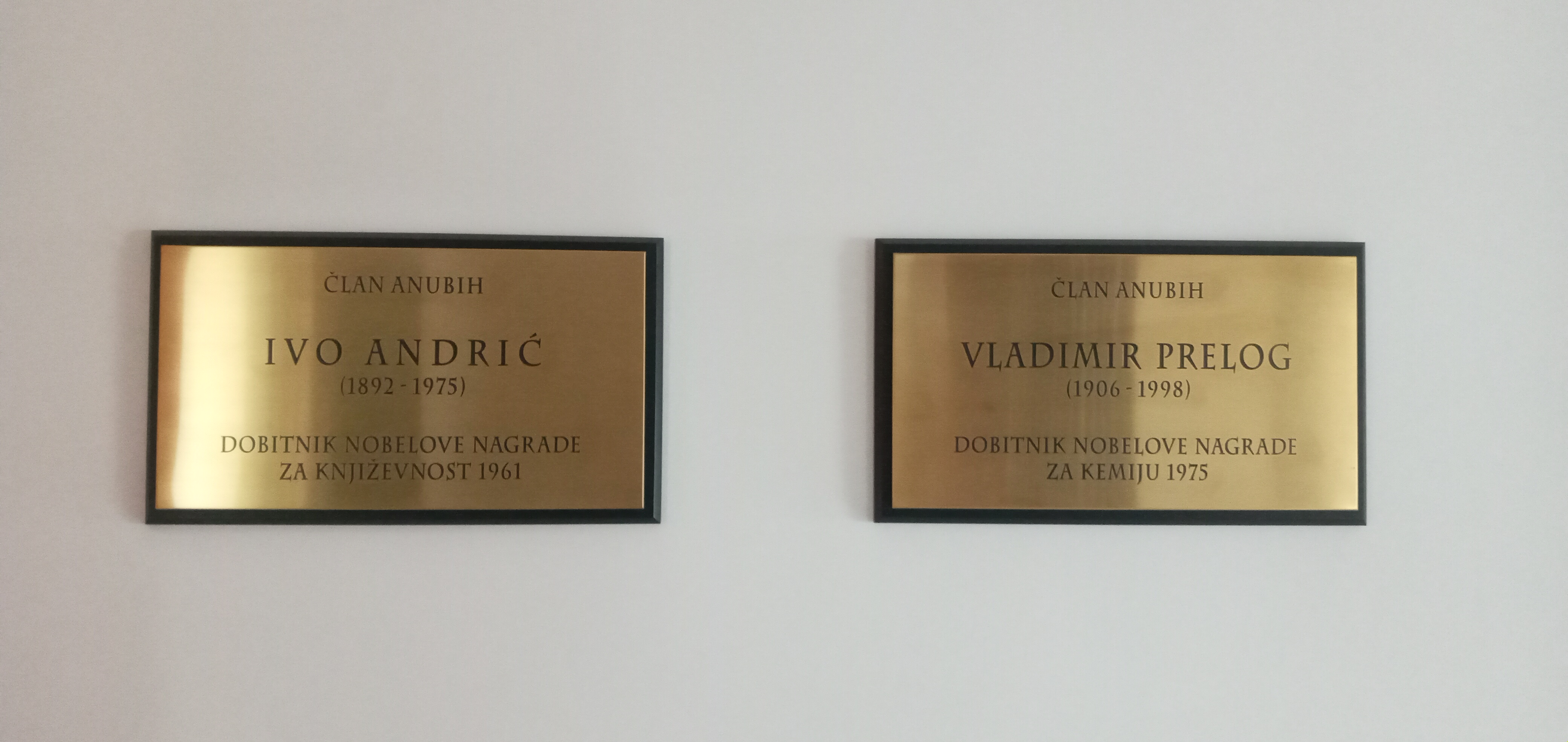
Plaques dedicated to Bosnian Nobel laureates Ivo Andrić and Vladimir Prelog at ANUBiH

Prelog was born in Sarajevo, Condominium of Bosnia and Herzegovina, at that time within Austria-Hungary, to Croat parents who were working there. His father, Milan, a native of Zagreb, was a history professor at a gymnasium in Sarajevo and later at the University of Zagreb. As an 8-year-old boy, he stood near the place where the assassination of Franz Ferdinand occurred.

=== Education ===
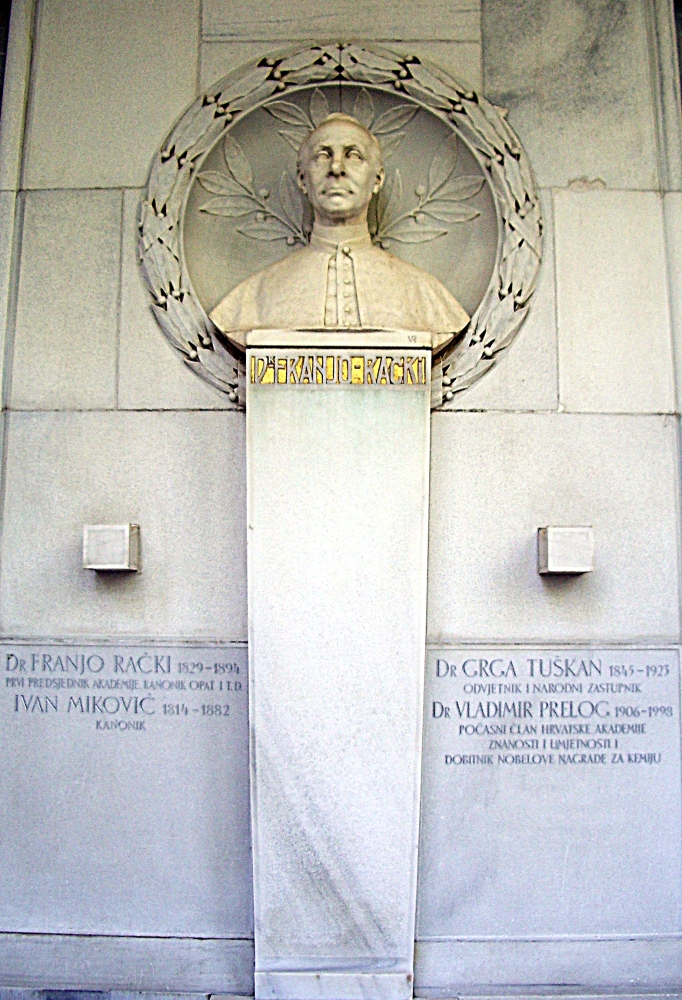
Monument of the Croatian Academy of Sciences and Arts to Franjo Rački, Ivan Miković, Grga Tuškan and Vladimir Prelog in Mirogoj Cemetery

Prelog started elementary school in Sarajevo. In 1915, at the beginning of the first World War, at 9 Prelog moved to Zagreb (then part of Austria-Hungary) with his parents. In Zagreb he graduated from elementary school and, from 1916 to 1919, attended gymnasium there. From 1919 to 1921 his father got a job in Osijek, so family moved there, and Prelog spent those two years attending Osijek gymnasium. There his professor Ivan Kuria sparked his interest and enthusiasm for chemistry.

It was in 1921 that, at the age of 15, and with his teacher’s help, he published a short communication entitled »Eine Titriervorrichtung« (Preparation for Titration) in the prestigious German journal »Chemiker-Zeitung«.

Prelog and Kuria became friends, and continued communicating by letters after Prelog left Osijek.. In a letter from March 16, 1922, Prelog wrote:

I am very busy at the moment. In addition to my routine studies, I have enrolled as an extramural student in the crafts school and I spend whole afternoons three times a week learning how to file, hammer and do all the other things that an eager young locksmith should know. I am doing it to be able to, should I feel like it, return to the homeland after finishing my studies. In this way, I also fence myself off such idle pastimes like dancing.« He continues by describing how he spent the winter enjoying winter sports and how he now, in spring, looks forward to bathing, climbing the Triglav and Grintavec mountains and sailing on lakes Bled and Bohinj. He concludes the letter by giving an enthusiastic account of his visit to the Chemical Analytical Institute in Zagreb: »I think this is the best equipped institute in SHS*. This wealth in platinum (a 300 g water beaker), optical instruments refractometers, spectroscopes, microscopes, etc., etc.) and all the analytical devices that God and the German have created – I have nowhere seen anything like that. It is run by Mr. Eisenhut.

Prelog completed his high school education in Zagreb in 1924. Following his father's wishes, he moved to Prague, where he received his diploma in chemical engineering from the Czech Technical University in 1928. He received his Sc.D in 1929. His teacher was Emil Votoček, while his assistant and mentor Rudolf Lukeš introduced him to the world of organic chemistry.

Upon leaving the Czech Technical University, Prelog worked in the plant laboratory of the private firm of G.J. Dríza in Prague; few academic positions were available due to the Great Depression. Prelog was in charge of the production of rare chemicals that were not commercially available at that time. He worked for Driza from 1929 until 1935. During the time, he got his first doctoral candidate, a company owner at Driza. He performed research in his spare time, investigating alkaloids in cacao bark.

== Career and research ==
The structure of adamantane, first synthesised by Prelog in 1941.

Prelog wanted to work in an academic environment, so he accepted the position of lecturer at the University of Zagreb in 1935. At the Technical Faculty in Zagreb, he lectured on organic chemistry and chemical engineering.

With the help of collaborators and students, Prelog started researching quinine and its related compounds. He was financially supported by the pharmaceutical factory "Kaštel", currently Pliva. He developed a financially successful method of producing Streptazol, one of the first commercial sulfonamides. In 1941, while at Zagreb, Prelog developed the first synthesis of adamantane, a hydrocarbon with an unusual structure that was isolated from Moravian oil fields.

=== Zürich ===
In 1941, in the midst of World War II, Prelog was invited to lecture in Germany by Richard Kuhn. Shortly afterwards, Lavoslav Ružička, whom Prelog asked for help, invited Prelog to visit him on his way to Germany. He and his wife used those invitations to escape to Zürich in Switzerland. With Ružička's help, he gained support from CIBA Ltd. and started to work in the Organic Chemistry Laboratory in the Swiss Federal Institute of Technology (ETH, or Eidgenössische Technische Hochschule). Prelog was able to separate the chiral enantiomers of Tröger's base in 1944 by chromatography on an optically active substrate.

With this chiral resolution, he was able to prove that not only carbon but also nitrogen atoms can be the chiral centre in a molecule, which had been speculated for several years. His relationship with Ružička helped him climb up the academic hierarchical ladder. Starting as an assistant, he became Privat-Dozent, Titularprofessor, associate professor, and in 1952 full professor. In 1957 he succeeded Ružička as head of the Laboratory. Since Prelog disliked administrative duties, he implemented rotating chairmanship in the ETH. Prelog joined the ETH at the right time, since Ružička's Jewish co-workers left the country and went to the United States, so Prelog filled the vacuum they left.

=== Later work in Switzerland ===
Prelog's main interest was focused on alkaloids. He found an ideal topic in the elucidation of the structure of solanine; he continued his work on Cinchona alkaloids and started to investigate strychnine. He showed that Robert Robinson's formula for strychnine was not correct. Although the formula he proposed was also not the right one, the discovery increased his international prestige. Later he worked on elucidating the structures of aromatic Erythrina alkaloids with Derek Barton, Oskar Jeger and Robert Burns Woodward.

At mid-century, the instrumental revolution necessitated a new approach to structural elucidation. Purely chemical methods had become outdated and had lost some of their intellectual appeal. Recognizing the growing importance of microbial metabolites, Prelog started working on these compounds, which possess unusual structures and interesting biological properties. It led him into antibiotics, and he subsequently elucidated the structures of such compounds as nonactin, boromycin, and rifamycins. For Prelog, natural products represented more than a chemical challenge. He considered them a record of billions of years of evolution.

In 1944 at the ETH, Prelog managed to separate enantiomers with "asymmetric" trivalent nitrogen by column chromatography at a time when this method was still in its infancy. His work on medium-sized alicyclic and heterocyclic rings established him as a pioneer in stereochemistry and conformational theory and brought an invitation to give the first Centenary Lecture of the Chemical Society in London in 1949. He synthesised medium-sized ring compounds with 8 to 12 members from dicarboxylic acid esters by acyloin condensation and explained their unusual chemical reactivity by a "nonclassical" strain because of energetically unfavorable conformations. He also contributed to the understanding of Bredt's rule by showing that a double bond may occur at the bridgehead if the ring is large enough.

In his research of asymmetric syntheses, Prelog studied enantioselective reactions and established rules for the relationship between configuration of educts and products. From Prelog's researches into the stereospecificity of microbiological reductions of alicyclic ketones and the enzymic oxidation of alcohols, he contributed not only to the knowledge of the mechanism of stereospecificity of enzymic reactions in general but also to the structure of the active site of the enzyme.

Specifying the growing number of stereoisomers of organic compounds became for Prelog one of his important aims. In 1954 he joined Robert Sidney Cahn and Christopher Kelk Ingold in their efforts to build a system for specifying a particular stereoisomers by simple and unambiguous descriptors that could be easily assigned and deciphered: The CIP system (Cahn–Ingold–Prelog) was developed for defining absolute configuration using "sequence rules". Together they published two papers. After Cahn and Ingold died, Prelog published a third paper on the topic. In 1959, Prelog obtained Swiss citizenship.

== Awards and honours ==
Prelog was elected to the American Academy of Arts and Sciences in 1960 and the United States National Academy of Sciences in 1961.

Prelog was elected a Foreign Member of the Royal Society (ForMemRS) in 1962 for his contribution to the development of modern stereochemistry.

Prelog received the 1975 Nobel Prize in Chemistry for his research into the stereochemistry of organic molecules and reaction, sharing it with the Australian/British research chemist John Cornforth. He was elected to the American Philosophical Society the following year.

In 1986, he became an honorary member of the Yugoslav Academy of Sciences and Arts. Prelog was also a member of Serbian Academy of Sciences and Arts.

== Personal life ==
In 1933, Prelog married Kamila Vitek. The couple had a son Jan (born 1949).

An intellectual with a wide cultural background, Prelog was one of the 109 Nobel Prize winners who signed the peace appeal for Croatia in 1991.

Vladimir Prelog died in Zürich, at the age of 91. An urn containing Prelog's ashes was ceremoniously interred at the Mirogoj cemetery in Zagreb on 27 September 2001. In 2008, a memorial to Prelog was unveiled in Prague.

== Bibliography ==
- Frängsmyr, Tore; Forsén, Sture, eds. (1993). Chemistry: 1971-1980. World Scientific. ISBN 9789810207861.
