= Backbone-dependent rotamer library =

Collection of data on conformations of a given protein's amino acid side chains

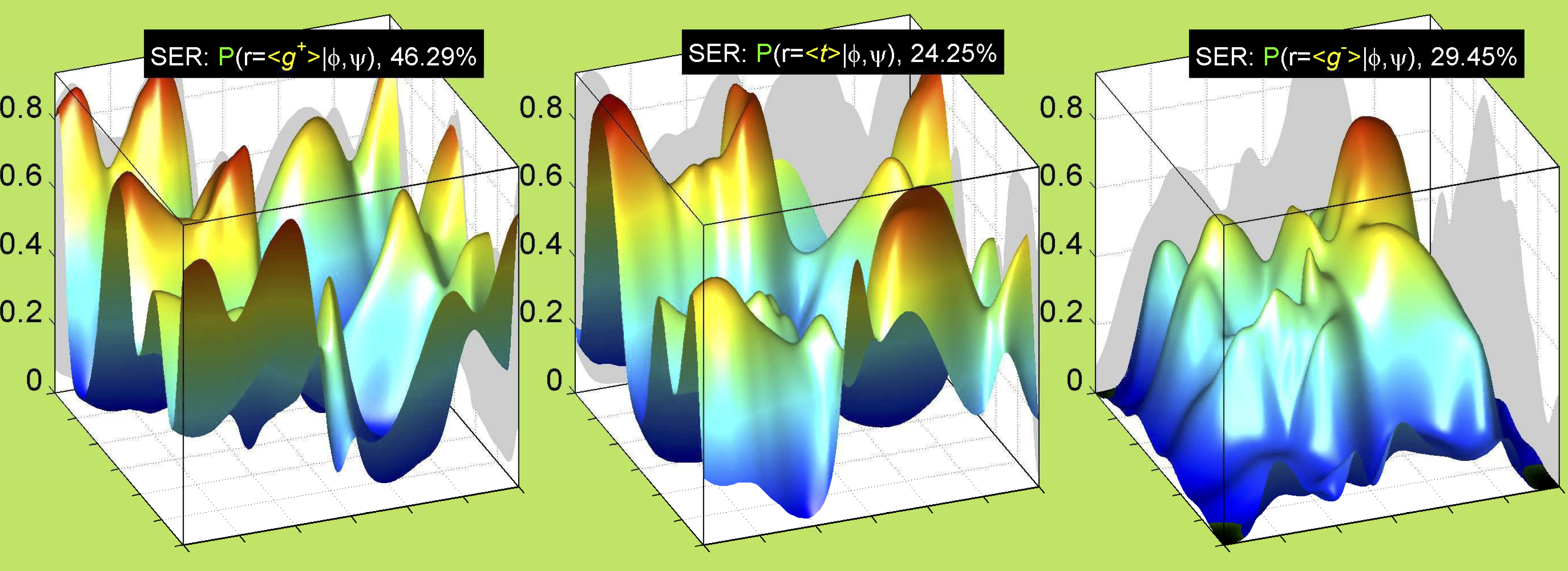
Backbone-dependent rotamer library for serine. Each plot shows the population of the χ_{1} rotamers of serine as a function of the backbone dihedral angles φ and ψ

In biochemistry, a backbone-dependent rotamer library provides the frequencies, mean dihedral angles, and standard deviations of the discrete conformations (known as rotamers) of the amino acid side chains in proteins as a function of the backbone dihedral angles φ and ψ of the Ramachandran map. By contrast, backbone-independent rotamer libraries express the frequencies and mean dihedral angles for all side chains in proteins, regardless of the backbone conformation of each residue type. Backbone-dependent rotamer libraries have been shown to have significant advantages over backbone-independent rotamer libraries, principally when used as an energy term, by speeding up search times of side-chain packing algorithms used in protein structure prediction and protein design.

== History ==
The first backbone-dependent rotamer library was developed in 1993 by Roland Dunbrack to assist the prediction of the Cartesian coordinates of a protein's side chains given the experimentally determined or predicted Cartesian coordinates of its main chain. The library was derived from the structures of 132 proteins from the Protein Data Bank with resolution of 2.0 Å or better. The library provided the counts and frequencies of χ_{1} or χ_{1}+χ_{2} rotamers of 18 amino acids (excluding glycine and alanine residue types, since they do not have a χ_{1} dihedral) for each 20° x 20° bin of the Ramachandran map (φ,ψ = -180° to -160°, -160° to -140° etc.).

In 1997, Dunbrack and Fred E. Cohen at the University of California, San Francisco presented a backbone-dependent rotamer library derived from Bayesian statistics. The Bayesian approach provided the opportunity for the definition of a Bayesian prior for the frequencies of rotamers in each 10° x 10° bin derived by assuming that the steric and electrostatic effects of the φ and ψ dihedral angles are independent. In addition, a periodic kernel with 180° periodicity was used to count side chains 180° away in each direction from the bin of interest. As an exponent of a sin^{2} function, it behaved much like a von Mises distribution commonly used in directional statistics. The 1997 library was made publicly available via the World Wide Web in 1997, and found early use in protein structure prediction and protein design. The library derived from Bayesian statistics was updated in 2002

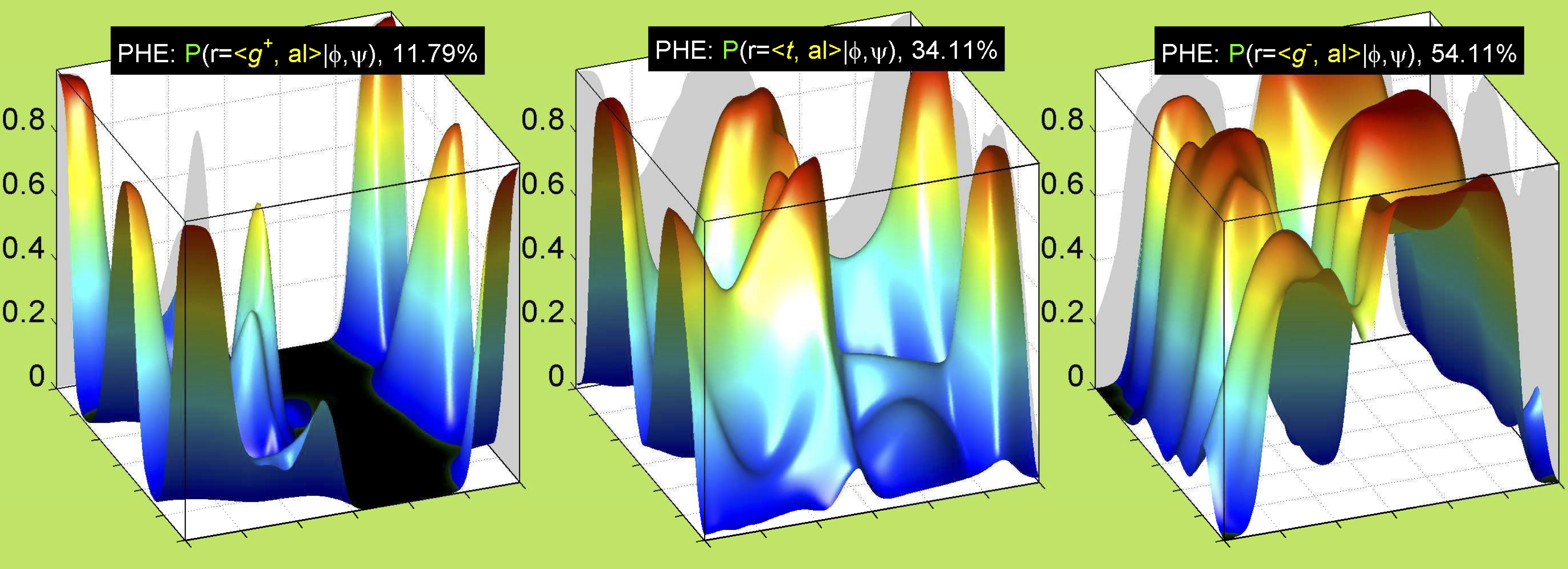
Backbone-dependent rotamer library for phenylalanine. Each plot shows the population of the χ_{1} rotamers of phenylalanine as a function of the backbone dihedral angles φ and ψ

Many modeling programs, such as Rosetta, use a backbone-dependent rotamer library as a scoring function (usually in the form E=-ln(p(rotamer(i) | φ,ψ)) for the ith rotamer, and optimize the backbone conformation of proteins by minimizing the rotamer energy with derivatives of the log probabilities with respect to φ,ψ. This requires smooth probability functions with smooth derivatives, because most mathematical optimization algorithms use first and sometimes second derivatives and will get stuck in local minima on rough surfaces. In 2011, Shapovalov and Dunbrack published a smoothed backbone-dependent rotamer library derived from kernel density estimates and kernel regressions with von Mises distribution kernels on the φ,ψ variables. The treatment of the non-rotameric degrees of freedom (those dihedral angles not about sp^{3}-sp^{3} bonds, such as asparagine and aspartate χ_{2}, phenylalanine, tyrosine, histidine, tryptophan χ_{2}, and glutamine and glutamate χ_{3}) was improved by modeling the dihedral angle probability density of each of these dihedral angles as a function of χ_{1} rotamer (or χ_{1} and χ_{2} for Gln and Glu) and φ,ψ. The functions are essentially regressions of a periodic probability density on a torus.

In addition to statistical analysis of structures in the Protein Data Bank, backbone-dependent rotamer libraries can also be derived from molecular dynamics simulations of proteins, as demonstrated by the Dynameomics Library from Valerie Daggett's research group. Because these libraries are based on sampling from simulations, they can generate far larger numbers of data points across regions of the Ramachandran map that are sparsely populated in experimental structures, leading to higher statistical significance in these regions. Rotamer libraries derived from simulations are dependent on the force field used in the simulations. The Dynameomics Library is built on simulations using the ENCAD force field of Levitt et al. from 1995.

== Backbone-dependence of rotamer populations ==
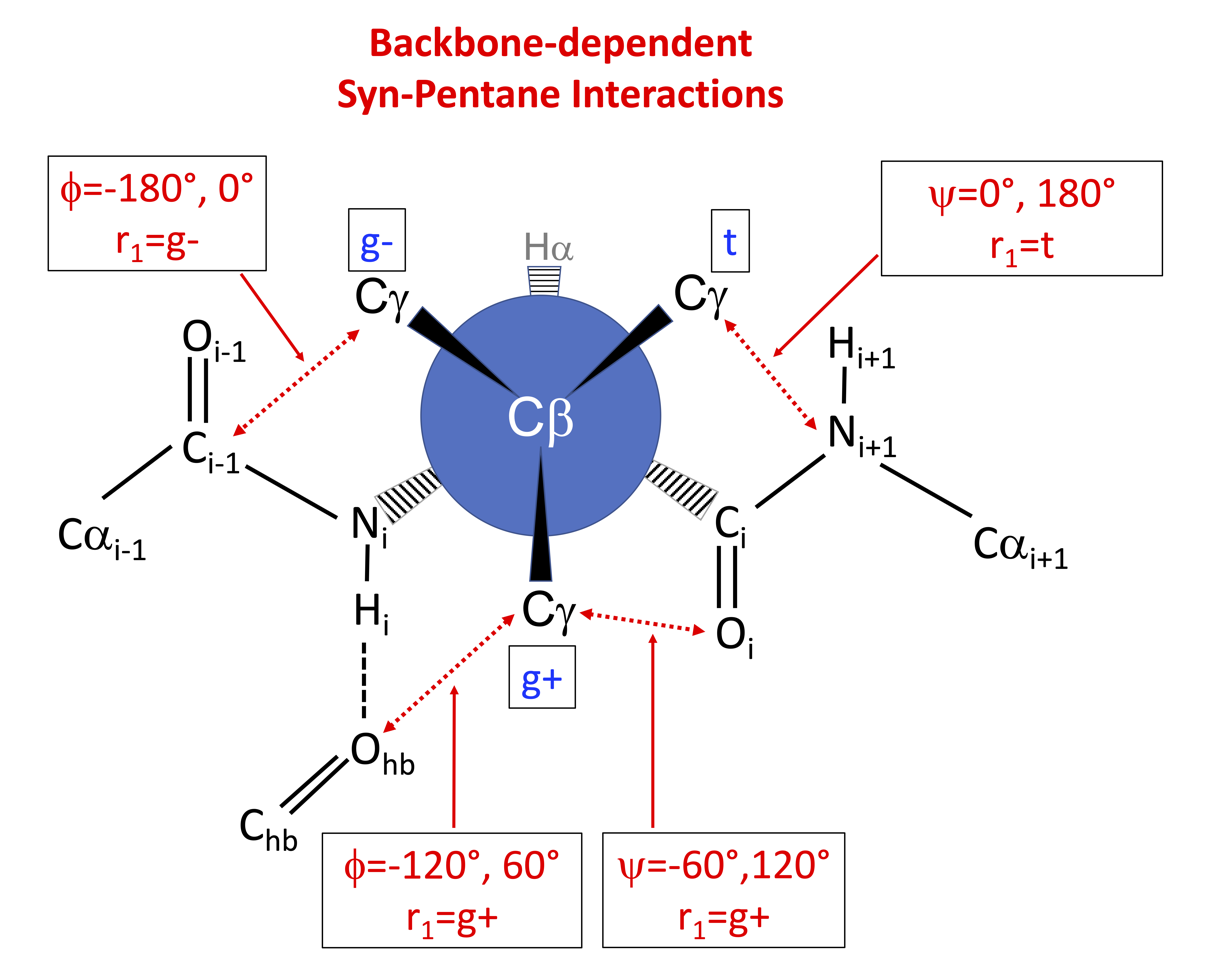
Steric interactions that affect the backbone-conformation-dependent rotamer preferences of amino acid side chains, shown in a Newman projection

The effect of backbone conformation on side-chain rotamer frequencies is primarily due to steric repulsions between backbone atoms whose position is dependent on φ and ψ and the side-chain γ heavy atoms (carbon, oxygen, or sulfur) of each residue type (PDB atom types CG, CG1, CG2, OG, OG1, SG). These occur in predictable combinations that depend on the dihedrals connecting the backbone atoms to the side-chain atoms. These steric interactions occur when the connecting dihedral angles form a pair of dihedral angles with values {-60°,+60°} or {+60°,-60°}, in a manner related to the phenomenon of pentane interference. For example, the nitrogen atom of residue i+1 is connected to the γ heavy atom of any side chain by a connected set of 5 atoms: N(i+1)-C(i)-Cα(i)-Cβ(i)-Cγ(i). The dihedral angle N(i+1)-C(i)-Cα(i)-Cβ(i) is equal to ψ+120°, and C(i)-Cα(i)-Cβ(i)-Cγ(i) is equal to χ_{1}-120°. When ψ is -60° and χ_{1} is +60° (the g+ rotamer of a side chain), there is a steric interaction between N(i+1) and Cγ because the dihedral angles connecting them are N(i+1)-C(i)-Cα(i)-Cβ(i) = ψ+120° = +60°, and C(i)-Cα(i)-Cβ(i)-Cγ(i) = χ_{1}-120° = -60°. The same interaction occurs when ψ is 0° and χ_{1} is 180° (the trans rotamer of a side chain). The carbonyl oxygen of residue i plays the same role when ψ=-60° for the g+ rotamer and when ψ=180° for the trans rotamer. Finally, φ-dependent interactions occur between the side-chain γ heavy atoms in g- and g+ rotamers on the one hand, and the carbonyl carbon of residue i-1 and a γ heavy atom, and between the backbone NH of residue i and its hydrogen-bonding partner on the other.

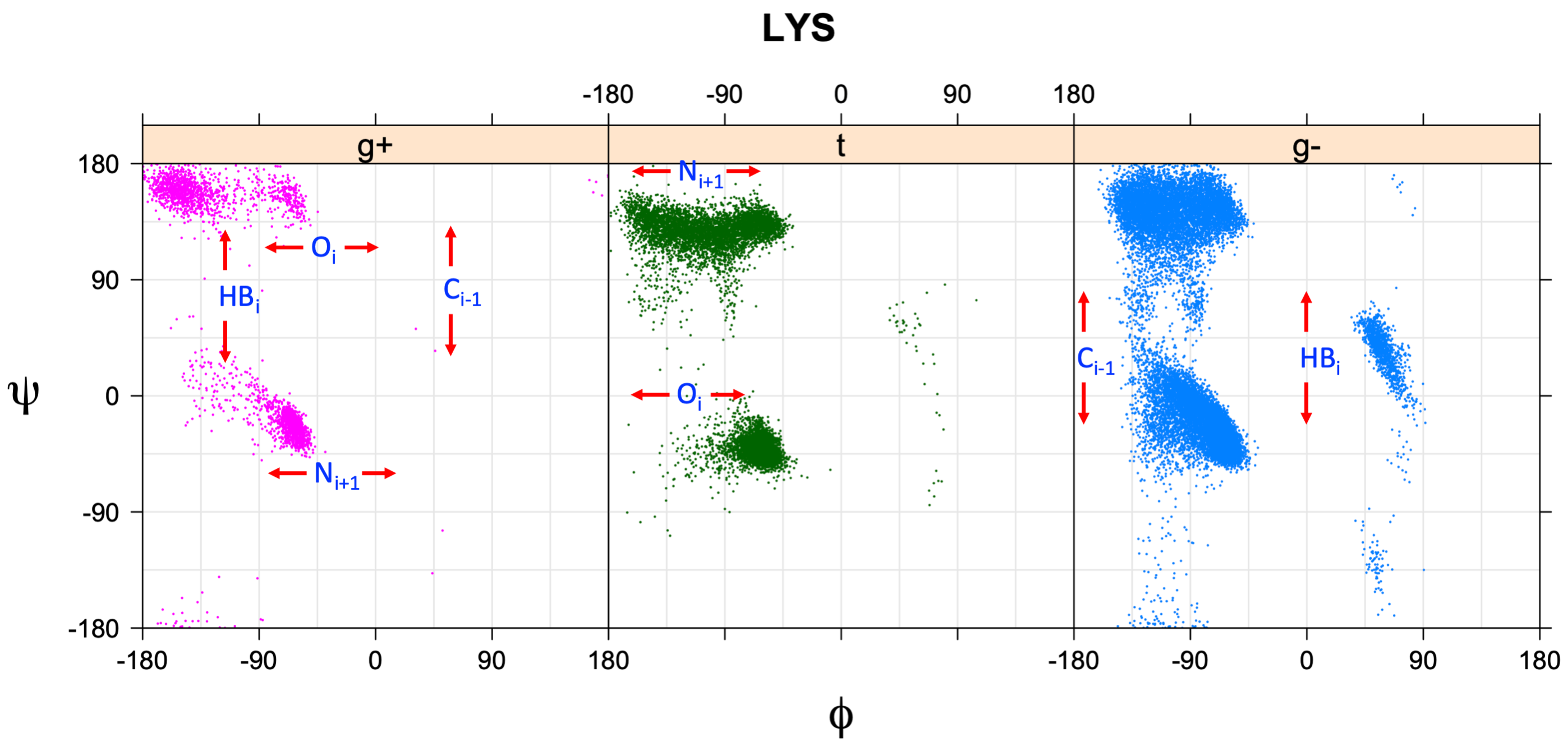
Side-chain/main-chain steric interactions that affect the Ramachandran plot distributions of amino acids. The data are for the amino acid lysine

The φ,ψ-dependent interactions of backbone atoms and side-chain Cγ atoms can be observed in the distribution of observations in the Ramachandran plot of each χ_{1} rotamer (marked in the figure). At these positions, the Ramachandran populations of the rotamers are significantly reduced. They can be summarized as follows:

φ,ψ-dependence of backbone/side-chain interactions
Rotamer	N(i+1)	O(i)
g+	ψ = -60°	ψ = +120°
trans	ψ = 180°	ψ = 0°
Rotamer	C(i-1)	HBond to NH(i)
g+	φ = +60°	φ = -120°
g-	φ = -180°	φ = 0°

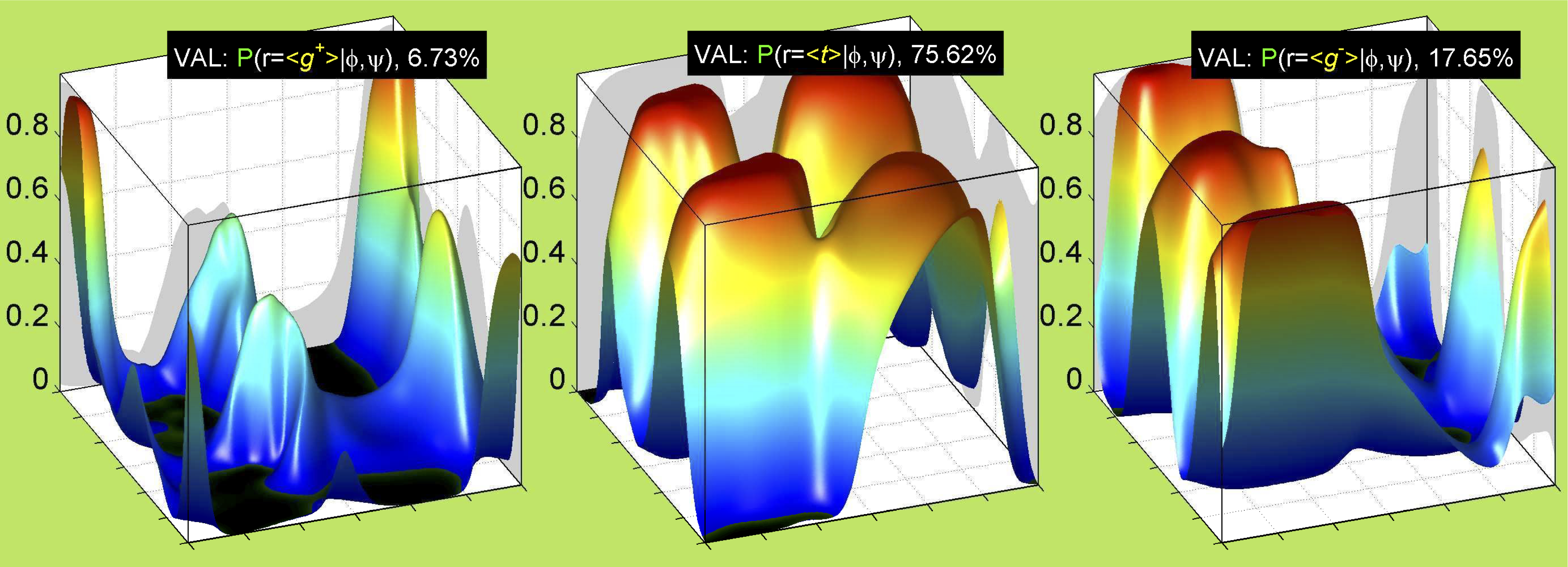
Backbone-dependent rotamer library for valine. Each plot shows the population of the χ_{1} rotamers of valine as a function of the backbone dihedral angles φ and ψ

Side-chain types with two heavy atoms (Val, Ile, Thr) have backbone-dependent interactions with both heavy atoms. Val has CG1 at χ_{1} and CG2 at χ_{1}+120°. Because Val g+ and g- conformations have steric interactions with the backbone near ψ=120° and -60° (the most populated ψ ranges), Val is the only amino acid where the t rotamer (χ_{1}~180°) is the most common. At most values of φ and ψ, only one rotamer of Val is allowed (shown in figure). Ile has CG1 at χ_{1} and CG2 at χ_{1}-120°. Thr has OG1 at χ_{1} and CG2 at χ_{1}-120°.

== Uses ==
The Dunbrack backbone-dependent rotamer library is used in a number of programs for protein structure prediction and computational design, including:

- Side-chain conformation prediction in protein structure modeling
  - Swiss-model and its software, ProMod3
  - Rosetta
  - I-TASSER
  - Phyre
  - OEChem TK
  - YASARA
  - GalaxyRefine
  - SCWRL4
- Protein Design
  - Rosetta
  - EvoEF2
- Visualization of Protein Mutations
  - PyMol
  - UCSF Chimera
