= Faculty of Chemical Engineering and Technology, University of Zagreb =

Faculty of the University of Zagreb, Croatia

Coordinates: 45°48′24″N 15°58′11″E

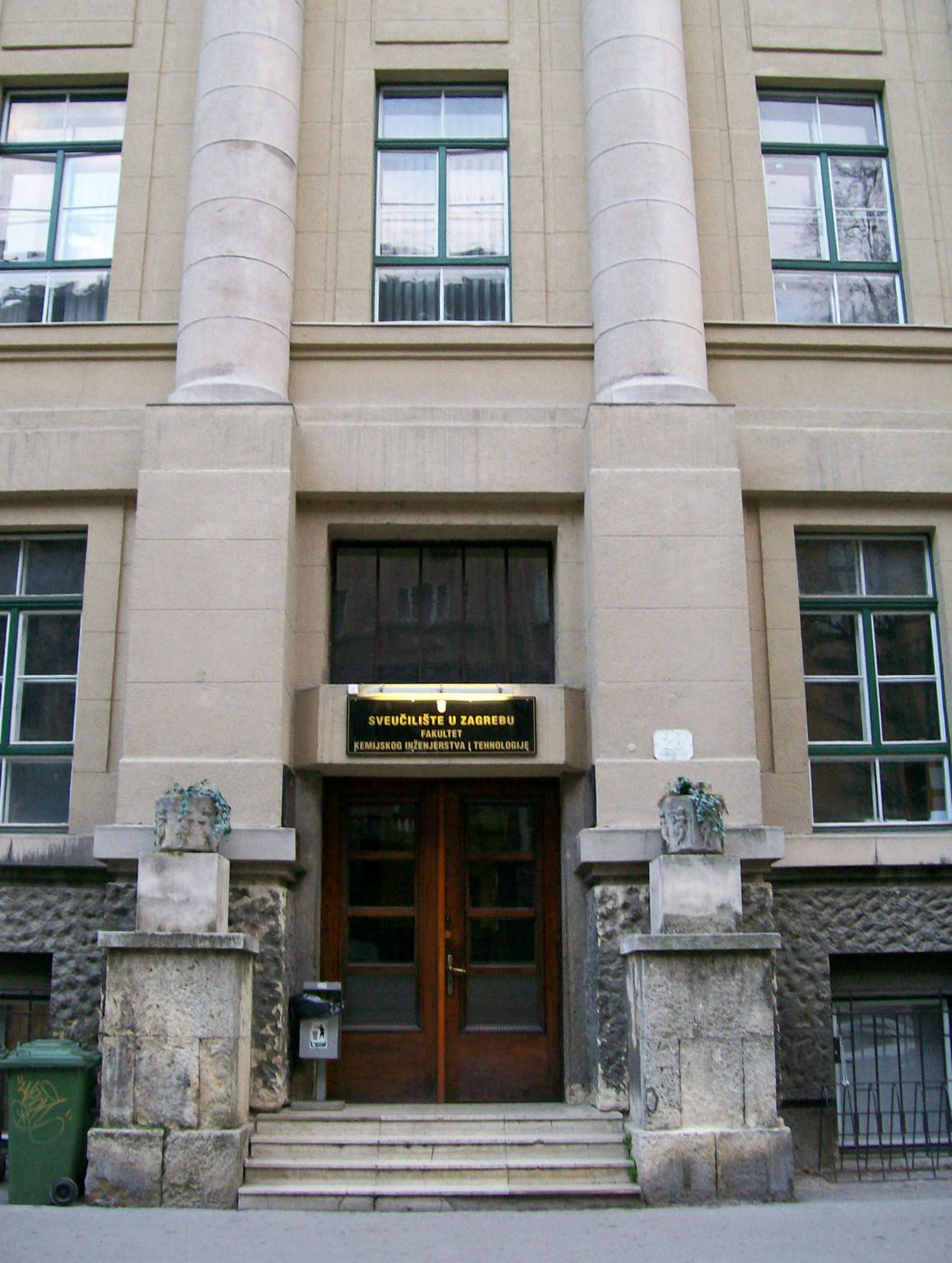
Faculty's main entrance.

The Faculty of Chemical Engineering and Technology (Croatian: Fakultet kemijskog inženjerstva i tehnologije, abbr: FKIT) is a faculty of the University of Zagreb. The Faculty is regarded as the largest faculty and the leading educational and research institution in the field of chemical engineering in Croatia.

== Organization and functions ==
Faculty of Chemical Engineering and Technology is organized in several Departments and Chairs that perform teaching, scientific work, professional and consulting activities in chemical engineering, chemistry and other fields.

== Brief history ==
Early beginnings of faculty go back to 1919 with foundation of the Technical Institute Zagreb with goal of educating professional experts, who previously went to study in Vienna or Prague, both in engineering and scientific fields. Among the six proposed departments was the Chemical-Technical Department, soon to be renamed into Chemical-Engineering Department. Vladimir Njegovan (1884–1971) was the first and only elected professor; his duty was to provide the necessary space (lecture rooms, offices and laboratories), laboratory equipment and to gather the teaching staff. He also held the first lecture in analytical chemistry, dated October 20, 1919. This date is currently celebrated as the Faculty Day.

Professor Njegovan succeeded in forming a group of experienced, inventive teachers and scientists. The first teacher of organic chemistry was professor Ivan Marek (1863–1936), recognized for his later innovations and improvements of the furnace for organic elemental analysis. Professor Ivan Plotnikov (1878–1955), a collaborator of Wilhelm Ostwald and world-famous photochemist soon joined the staff to take chairs in physics and physical chemistry. The first professor of metallurgy and chemical technology was Franjo Hanaman, a co-inventor of the tungsten filament for electric lamps.

In 1926 the Technical Institute joined the University of Zagreb, a much stronger institution with long tradition dating back to 1669. However, the chemical technology curriculum at the newly established Technical Faculty remained practically the same in the next few years.

Especially noted position in history of the Faculty is reserved to professor Vladimir Prelog, winner of Nobel prize in chemistry in 1975, who held a chair in organic chemistry from 1934 to 1941 and established strong bonds with local scientist and also with industry in production of medicines but also interesting new molecules like adamantane.

In 1956, after the independence of some Departments, Technical Faculty ceased to exist. chemical technology continues to work as newly established Faculty of Technology. From the latter one, with development and accentuation of particular professions in industry, in 1978 separates the Faculty of Metallurgy, in 1980 the Faculty of Food Technology and Biotechnology, and in 1991. the Faculty of Textile Technology and modern Faculty of Chemical Engineering and Technology.

== Notable professors ==
- Vladimir Prelog, professor of organic chemistry and winner of 1975 Nobel prize in chemistry
- Franjo Hanaman, inventor of contemporary classic light bulb with tungsten-tantalum alloy
- Slobodan Đokić, head of research team which discovered azithromycin (Sumamed, Zithromax etc.) in 1980
