= Pentane interference =

Steric effect from the spatial arrangement of methyl groups in n-pentane

Pentane interference or syn-pentane interaction is the steric hindrance that the two terminal methyl groups experience in one of the chemical conformations of n-pentane. The possible conformations are combinations of anti conformations and gauche conformations and are anti-anti, anti-gauche^{+}, gauche^{+} - gauche^{+} and gauche^{+} - gauche^{−} of which the last one is especially energetically unfavorable. In macromolecules such as polyethylene pentane interference occurs between every fifth carbon atom. The 1,3-diaxial interactions of cyclohexane derivatives is a special case of this type of interaction, although there are additional gauche interactions shared between substituents and the ring in that case. A clear example of the syn-pentane interaction is apparent in the diaxial versus diequatorial heats of formation of cis 1,3-dialkyl cyclohexanes. Relative to the diequatorial conformer, the diaxial conformer is 2-3 kcal/mol higher in energy than the value that would be expected based on gauche interactions alone. Pentane interference helps explain molecular geometries in many chemical compounds, product ratios, and purported transition states. One specific type of syn-pentane interaction is known as 1,3 allylic strain or (A^{1,3} strain).

For instance in certain aldol adducts with 2,6-disubstituted aryl groups the molecular geometry has the vicinal hydrogen atoms in an antiperiplanar configuration both in a crystal lattice (X-ray diffraction) and in solution proton (NMR coupling constants) normally reserved for the most bulky groups i.d. both arenes:

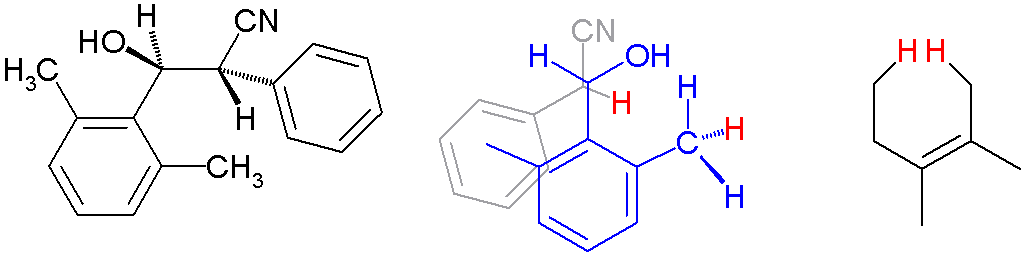
Syn-pentane effect in aldol adducts

The other contributing factor explaining this conformation is reduction in allylic strain by minimizing the dihedral angle between the arene double bond and the methine proton.

Syn-pentane interactions are responsible for the backbone-conformation dependence of protein side chain rotamer frequencies and their mean dihedral angles, which is evident from statistical analysis of protein side-chain rotamers in the Backbone-dependent rotamer library.
