= Akamptisomer =

Type of conformational isomer

An akamptisomer is a type of conformational isomer characterized by a hindered inversion of a bond angle. It was first discovered in 2018 in a series of bridged porphyrin molecules.

Normally, molecules with a bent or pyramidal central atom can invert by passing through either a planar or linear transition state and then reforming the original pyramidal or bent structure. This reformation allows the substituents to switch positions and create interconvertible conformers. For molecules with lots of steric hindrance or extremely rigid polycyclic frameworks, the formation of a planar or linear geometry structure is effectively blocked off due to the extreme amount of energy needed to form the linear or planar transitional state. This results in the formation of two distinct, stable isomers called akamptisomers.
