= Klyne–Prelog system =

In stereochemistry, the Klyne–Prelog system (named for William Klyne and Vladimir Prelog) for describing conformations about a single bond offers a more systematic means to unambiguously name complex structures, where the torsional or dihedral angles are not found to occur in 60° increments. Klyne notation views the placement of the substituent on the front atom as being in regions of space called anti/syn and clinal/periplanar relative to a reference group on the rear atom. A plus (+) or minus (−) sign is placed at the front to indicate the sign of the dihedral angle. Anti or syn indicates the substituents are on opposite sides or the same side, respectively. Clinal substituents are found within 30° of either side of a dihedral angle of 60° (from 30° to 90°), 120° (90°–150°), 240° (210°–270°), or 300° (270°–330°). Periplanar substituents are found within 30° of either 0° (330°–30°) or 180° (150°–210°). Juxtaposing the designations produces the following terms for the conformers of butane (see Alkane stereochemistry for an explanation of conformation nomenclature): gauche butane is syn-clinal (+sc or −sc, depending on the enantiomer), anti butane is anti-periplanar, and eclipsed butane is syn-periplanar.
