= Enantiopure drug =

Class of pharmaceutical drug

An enantiopure drug is a pharmaceutical available in one specific enantiomeric form. Most biomolecules (proteins, sugars, etc.) are present in only one of many chiral forms, so different enantiomers of a chiral drug molecule bind differently (or not at all) to target receptors.

The use of a drug with a single enantiomer intends to make it more effective. One enantiomer of a drug may have a desired beneficial effect while the other may cause serious and undesired side effects, or sometimes even beneficial but entirely different effects. The desired enantiomer of a given drug is known as the eutomer while the undesired enantiomer is known as the distomer. When equal amounts of both enantiomers are found in a mixture, the mixture is known as a racemic mixture. If a mixture for a drug does not have a 1:1 ratio of its enantiomers it is a candidate for an enantiopure drug.

Advances in industrial chemical processes have made it economical for pharmaceutical manufacturers to take drugs that were originally marketed as a racemic mixture and market the individual enantiomers, either by specifically manufacturing the desired enantiomer or by resolving a racemic mixture. On a case-by-case basis, the U.S. Food and Drug Administration (FDA) has allowed single enantiomers of certain drugs to be marketed under a different name than the racemic mixture. Also case-by-case, the United States Patent Office has granted patents for single enantiomers of certain drugs. The regulatory review for marketing approval (safety and efficacy) and for patenting (proprietary rights) is independent, and differs country by country.

== History ==
In 1848, Louis Pasteur became the first scientist to discover chirality and enantiomers while he was working with tartaric acid. During the experiments, he noticed that there were two crystal structures produced but these structures looked to be non-superimposable mirror images of each other; this observation of isomers that were non-superimposable mirror images became known as enantiomers. A couple years later, in 1857, Pasteur then discovered enantioselectivity when he noticed that the two enantiomer structures he had previously discovered metabolized at much different speeds. This suggested that one configuration was preferred over the other in vivo. As organic chemistry knowledge became more advanced, the discovery of enantioselectivity was used in the creation of enantiopure drugs.

== Enantiopure drugs from chiral drugs ==
Chirality can be observed when the geometric properties of an object is not superimposable with its mirror image. Two forms of a molecule are formed (both mirror images) from a chiral carbon, these two forms are called enantiomers.

The formation of an enantiopure drug results from the separation of the enantiomers of a chiral drug. This separation was prompted when it was found that each enantiomer of a molecule can have different effects when used as pharmaceuticals. This is because the body is very chiral selective, reacting to each enantiomer differently and therefore producing different pharmaceutical effects.

Before a drug of a pure enantiomer can be formed, the two enantiomers must first be separated and tested. Three main techniques are used for this separation: capillary gas chromatography, high performance liquid chromatography, and capillary electrophoresis. Other techniques such as chiral crystallization, enzyme-based kinetic separation, and enantioselective synthesis are also used.

== Importance ==
The body of living organisms are composed of many enantiopure chiral substances. For example, amino acids that make up the proteins in the body have the same configuration, L-absolute configuration. Because of this specificity, vital processes such as constructing proteins, rely on stereoselectivity to ensure that out of all the potential enantiomers available, the body is utilizing the correct enantiopure compound.

Selectivity is a very important part of organic synthesis. In scientific papers regarding synthesis, selectivity is often listed in data tables alongside percent yield and other reaction conditions. While selectivity is deemed important in scientific literature, it has been challenging to effectively implement selectivity in drug development and production. A major issue with selectivity in pharmaceuticals is that a large percentage of drug syntheses by nature are not selective reactions, racemic mixtures are formed as the products. Separating racemic mixtures into their respective enantiomers takes extra time, money, and energy.

One way to separate enantiomers is to chemically convert them into species that can be separated: diastereomers. Diastereomers, unlike enantiomers, have entirely different physical properties—boiling points, melting points, NMR shifts, solubilities—and they can be separated by conventional means such as chromatography or recrystallization. This is a whole extra step in the synthesis process and not desirable from a manufacturing standpoint. As a result, a number of pharmaceuticals are synthesized and marketed as a racemic mixture of enantiomers in cases where the less-effective enantiomer is benign. However, by identifying and specifically purifying the enantiomer which effectively binds to its respective binding site in the body, less of the drug would be needed to achieve the desired effect. With the improvement of chiral technology, a rich repertoire of enantioselective chromatographic methods have become available for the separation of drug enantiomers on the analytical, preparative, and industrial scales.

== Criteria ==
According to the FDA, the stereoisomeric composition of a chiral drug should be known, and its effects should be well-characterized from pharmacologic, toxicologic, and clinical standpoints. In order to profile the different stereoisomers of enantiopure drugs, manufacturers are urged to develop quantitative assays for individual enantiomers in in vivo samples early in the development stage.

Ideally, the main pharmacologic activities of the isomers should be compared in in vitro systems in animals. During instances when toxic findings are present beyond the natural extensions of the pharmacologic effects of the drug, toxicologic evaluation of the individual isomers in question must be completed.

== Patenting ==
When drugs are covered under patent protection, only the pharmaceutical company that holds the patent is allowed to manufacture, market, and eventually profit from them. The lifetime of the patent varies between countries and also between drugs; in the United States, most drug patents last about twenty years. Once the patent has expired, the drug can be manufactured and sold by other companies - at which point, it is referred to as a generic drug. Its availability on the market as a generic drug removes the monopoly of the patent holder, thereby encouraging competition and causing a significant drop in drug prices, which ensures that life-saving and important drugs reach the general population at fair prices. However, the company holding the initial patent may get a new patent by forming a new version of the drug that is significantly changed compared to the original compound.

Patentability of different isomers has been controversial over the past ten years and there have been a number of related legal issues. In making their determinations, courts have looked at factors including: (i) Whether the racemate was known in the prior art. (ii) The difficulty in resolving the enantiomers. (iii) The stereoselectivity of the relevant receptor. (iv) Other secondary considerations of non-obviousness such as commercial success, unexpected results, and satisfaction of long-felt needs in the art. The decisions made regarding these issues have varied and there is no clear answer to the legality of patenting stereoisomers. These issues have been resolved on a case-by-case basis. With the number of current pharmaceuticals currently being marketed as racemic mixtures, it is likely that patentability will continue to be debated in the near future.

=== Ibuprofen case ===
There are examples of common drugs, like ibuprofen, where the use of chiral switching has caused controversy. Ibuprofen is a racemic mixture where the S-enantiomer is known to play a major role in reducing inflammation as it inhibits COX-2 (cyclooxygenase 2) compared to the R-enantiomer; the fact that the S-enantiomer is stronger is what led to the chiral switching. But, when the racemic ibuprofen enters the body, a little over half of the R-enantiomers experience chiral inversion and transform into the favored S-enantiomer. This observation has led to a conclusion that the racemic and the S-enantiomer are potentially biologically equivalent. Because of this and the more recent evidence suggesting that the R-enantiomer may actually contribute to COX-2 inhibition, as well, but at a slower rate, there is still debate on whether or not the chiral switching seen in ibuprofen is really advantageous or if it is just to give patent protections to the manufacturers.

== Examples ==
The following table lists pharmaceuticals that have been available in both racemic and single-enantiomer form. These single-enantiomer drug switched from the respective racemic drug are referred to as chiral switch.

Racemic mixture	Single-enantiomer
Amlodipine (Norvasc)	Levamlodipine (Conjupri)
Amphetamine (Benzedrine)	Dextroamphetamine (Dexedrine)
Bupivacaine (Marcain)	Levobupivacaine (Chirocaine)
Cetirizine (Zyrtec / Reactine)	Levocetirizine (Xyzal)
Chlorphenamine (INN); Chlorpheniramine (USAN) (Chlor-Trimeton)	Dexchlorpheniramine (Polaramine)
Citalopram (Celexa / Cipramil)	Escitalopram (Lexapro / Cipralex)
Fenfluramine (Pondimin)	Dexfenfluramine (Redux)
Formoterol (Foradil)	Arformoterol (Brovana)
Ibuprofen (Advil / Motrin)	Dexibuprofen (Seractil)
Ketamine (Ketalar)	Esketamine (Ketanest S)
Ketoprofen (Actron)	Dexketoprofen (Keral)
Methylphenidate (Ritalin)	Dexmethylphenidate (Focalin)
Milnacipran (Ixel / Savella)	Levomilnacipran (Fetzima)
Modafinil (Provigil)	Armodafinil (Nuvigil)
Ofloxacin (Floxin)	Levofloxacin (Levaquin)
Omeprazole (Prilosec)	Esomeprazole (Nexium)
Salbutamol (Ventolin)	Levalbuterol (Xopenex)
Zopiclone (Imovane / Zimovane)	Eszopiclone (Lunesta)

The following are cases where the individual enantiomers have markedly different effects:

The S enantiomer causes birth defects, while the R enantiomer is effective against morning sickness.

- Thalidomide: Thalidomide is racemic. One enantiomer is effective against morning sickness, whereas the other is teratogenic. However, the enantiomers are converted into each other in vivo. As a result, dosing with a single-enantiomer form of the drug will still lead to both the enantiomers eventually being present in the patient's serum and thus would not prevent adverse effects—at best, it might reduce them if the rate of in vivo conversion can be slowed.
- Ethambutol: Whereas the (S,S)-(+)-enantiomer is used to treat tuberculosis, the (R,R)-(–)-ethambutol may cause blindness.

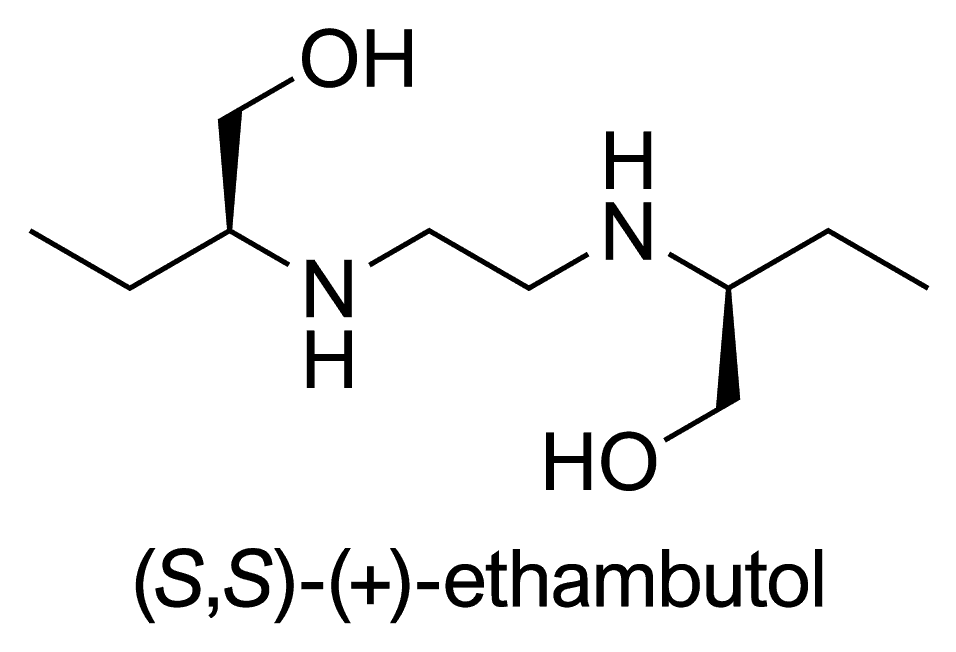
Enantiomer of ethambutol used to treat tuberculosis

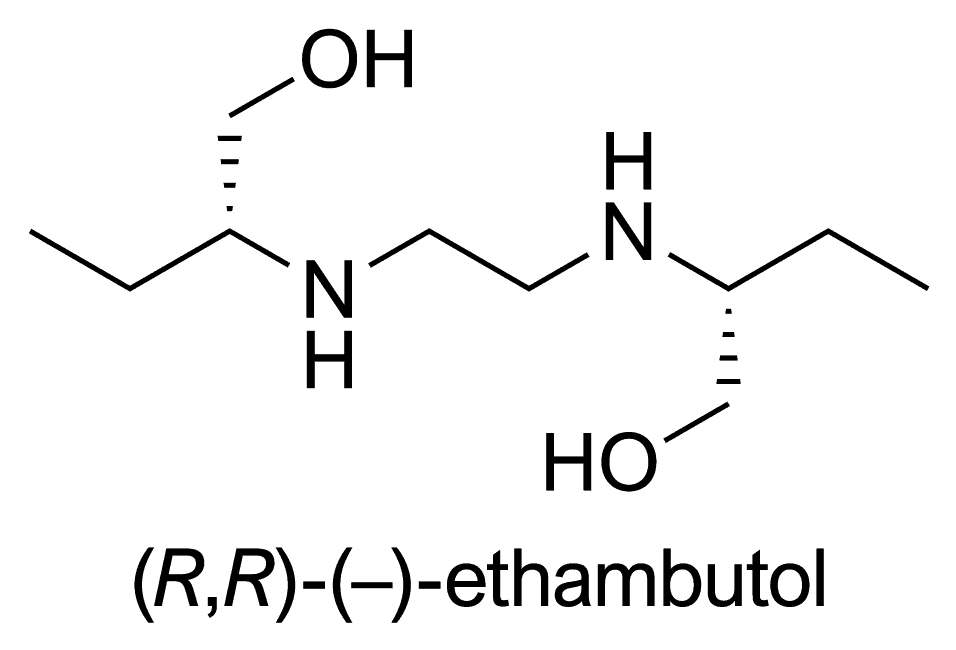
Enantiomer of ethambutol that causes blindness

- Steroid receptor sites also show stereoisomer specificity.
- Penicillin's activity is stereodependent. The antibiotic must mimic the D-alanine chains that occur in the cell walls of bacteria in order to react with and subsequently inhibit bacterial transpeptidase enzyme.
- Propranolol: L-propranolol is a powerful adrenoceptor antagonist, whereas D-propranolol is not. However, both have local anesthetic effect.
- Methorphan: The L-isomer of methorphan, levomethorphan, is a potent opioid analgesic, while the D-isomer, dextromethorphan, is a dissociative cough suppressant.
- Carvedilol: (S)-(–)-isomer interacts with adrenoceptors with 100 times greater potency as β adrenoreceptor blocker than (R)-(+)-isomer. However, both the isomers are approximately equipotent as α adrenoreceptor blockers.
- Amphetamine and methamphetamine: The D-isomers of these drugs are strong central nervous system (CNS) stimulants, while the L-isomers lack appreciable CNS stimulant effects, but instead stimulate the peripheral nervous system. For this reason, the L-isomer of methamphetamine is available as an over-the-counter nasal inhaler in some countries, while the D-isomer is banned from medical use in all but a few countries in the world, and highly regulated in those countries which do allow it to be used medically.

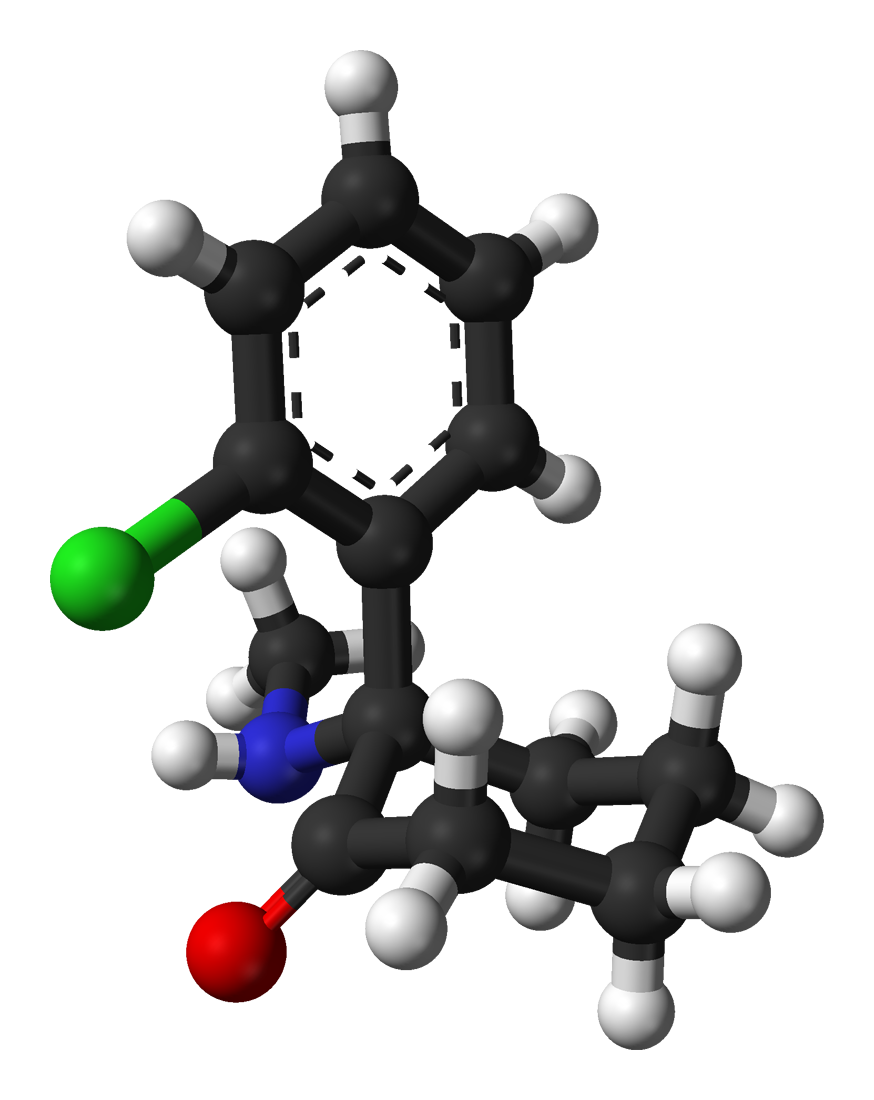
Esketamine

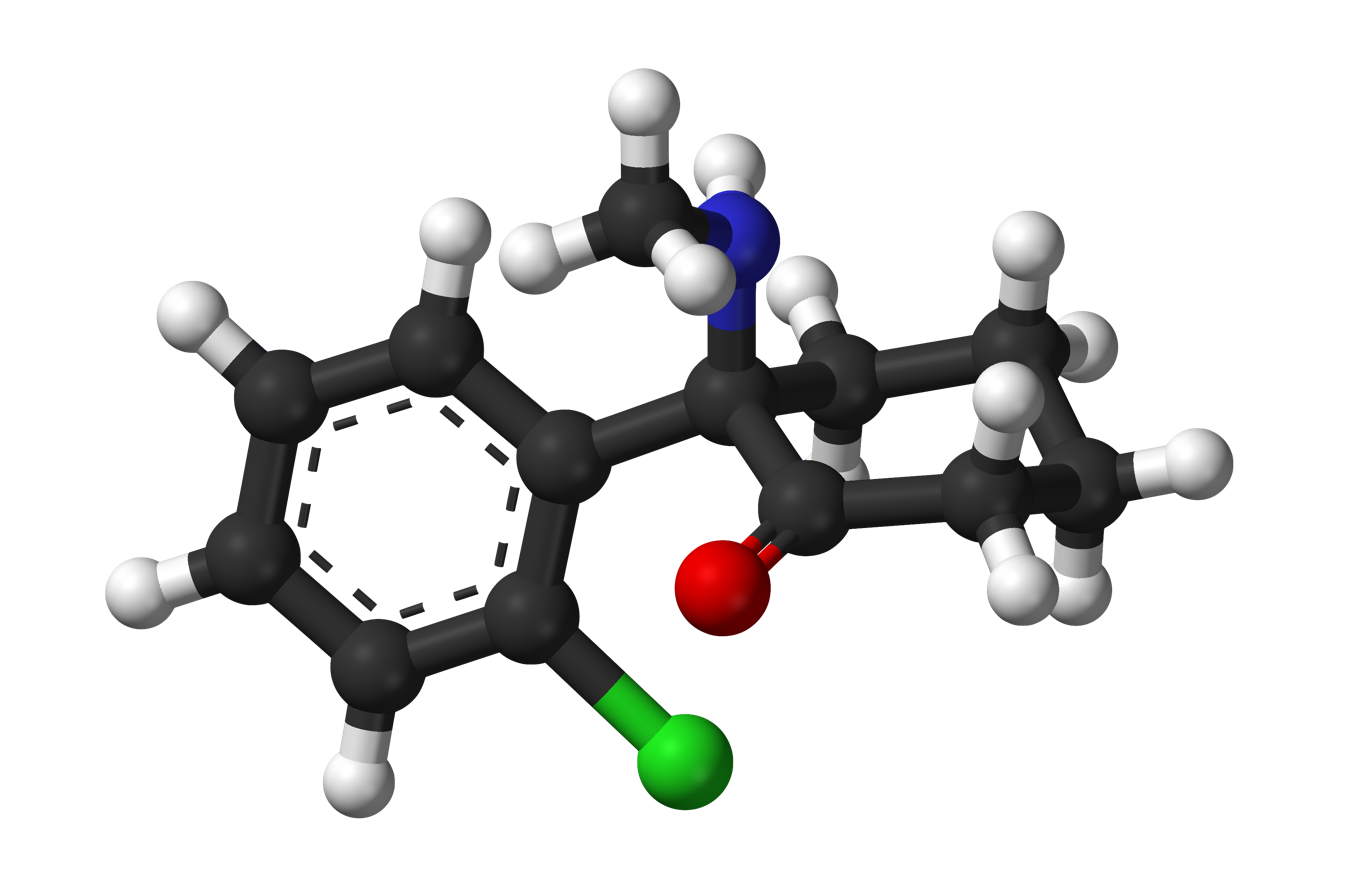
Arketamine

Esketamine, (S)-(–)-ketamine, is more pharmacologically potent than its enantiomer
- Ketamine: This drug is available as a mixture of both (S)-(+)-ketamine, also known as esketamine, and (R)-(–)-ketamine, also known as arketamine. Pure esketamine is also available. The two have different dissociative and hallucinogenic properties, with esketamine being more potent in isolation as a dissociative. The two enantiomers have inverse effects on the rate of glucose metabolism in the frontal cortex.
- Dihydroxy-3, 4 phenylalanine (Dopa): Dopa is a racemic mixture where one enantiomer, L-Dopa, is used as a treatment for Parkinson's Disease, and the other enantiomer, D-Dopa is considered to be toxic. D-Dopa can cause headaches, abdominal pains, nausea, vomiting, and dizziness.

== See also ==
- Eudysmic ratio
- Chiral switch
- Chiral drugs
