= Chiral inversion =

Conversion of an enantiomer to its mirror image

Chiral inversion is the process of conversion of one enantiomer of a chiral molecule to its mirror-image version with no other change in the molecule.

Chiral inversion happens depending on various factors (viz. biological-, solvent-, light-, temperature- induced, etc.) and the energy barrier associated with the stereogenic element present in the chiral molecule. 2-Arylpropionic acid nonsteroidal anti-inflammatory drugs (NSAIDs) provide one of the best pharmaceutical examples of chiral inversion. Chirality is attributed to a molecule due to the presence of a stereogenic element (viz. center, planar, helical, or axis). Many pharmaceutical drugs are chiral and have a labile (configurationally unstable) stereogenic element. Chiral compounds with stereogenic center are found to have high energy barriers for inversion and generally undergo biologically mediated chiral inversion. While compounds with helical or planar chirality have low energy barriers and chiral inversions are often caused by solvent, light, temperature. When this happens, the configuration of the chiral molecule may rapidly change reversibly or irreversibly depending on the conditions. The chiral inversion has been intensively studied in the context of the pharmacological and toxicological consequences. Other than NSAIDs, chiral drugs with different chemical structures can also show this effect.

Chiral drugs have different effects on the body depending on whether one enantiomer or both enantiomers act on different biological targets. As a result, chiral inversion can change how a pharmaceutical drug works in the body. From a pharmacological and toxicological point of view, it is very important to learn more about chiral inversion, the things that make it happen, and the tools used to figure out chiral inversion.

== Types ==
Essentially there are two types of chiral inversion, unidirectional and bidirectional. Inversion process is dependent on species and substrate.

Unidirectional
chiral inversion (enzyme mediated) was described only with 2-arylpropionate nonsteroidal anti-inflammatory drugs (NSAIDs), namely ibuprofen, ketoprofen, fenoprofen, benoxaprophen, etc. For this group, only S-enantiomer (eutomer) is active i.e. has analgesic and anti-inflammatory effect. In the body, only inactive R-enantiomer can undergo chiral inversion by hepatic enzymes into the active S-enantiomer and not vice versa. The “inactive” R-isomer (distomer) may be responsible for the gastrointestinal irritation and related side-effects associated with NSAIDs. In certain situations, carbenicillin, ethiazide, etoposide, zopiclone, pantoprazole, clopidogrel, ketorolac, albendazole-sulfoxide, lifibrol, and 5-aryl-thiazolidinedione also go through unidirectional chiral inversion. Chiral inversions were found to happen in a group of important compounds called α-amino acids. Amino acids exist in two mirror-image versions (D- and L- configurations). Several D-amino acids, like D-methionine, D-proline, D-serine, D-alanine, D-aspartate, D-leucine, and D-phenylalanine, have been shown to go through unidirectional chiral inversion in mammals.

Bidirectional
chiral inversion or racemization type of inversion is shown by pharmaceutical drugs including 3-hydroxy-benzodiazapine class of drugs (Oxazepam, lorazepam, temazepam), thalidomide, and tiaprofenic acid. A brief list of select pharmaceutical drugs that go through chiral inversion are presented in Table below..

List (select) of pharmaceutical drugs that undergo chiral inversion
Pharmaceutical drug	Therapeutic category	Species	Model system	References
Ibuprofen	NSAID	Man, rat, mouse, guinea pig	In vivo	Aso, Yoshioka, & Yasushi, 1990
Ketoprofen	NSAID	Rabbit, rat, human	In vivo	Jamali, Mehvar, & Psutto, 1989
Benoxaprophen	NSAID	Human	In vivo	Caldwell, Hutt, & Fournel-Gifleu, 1988
Fenoprofen	NSAID	Human, rabbit	In vivo	Jamali, Mehvar, & Psutto, 1989
Ketorolac	NSAID	Man/Rat	In vitro	Vakily, Corrigan, & Jamali, 1995
Carbenicillin	Antimicrobial	Man	In vitro	Aso, Yoshioka, & Yasushi, 1990
Thalidomide	Immunomodulatory agent	Man	In vitro	Eriksson, Björkman, & Höglund, 2001
Ketamine	General anaesthetic	Rat	In vivo	Edwards, & Mather, 2001
Ethiazide	Diuretic	Man	In vitro	Aso, Yoshioka, & Yasushi, 1990
Zopiclone	Hypnotics and sedatives	Rat	In vitro	Fernandez, et al.., 2002
Clopidogrel	Antiplatlet medication	Rat	In vitro	Reist, et al., 2000
Albendazol-sulfoxide	Anthelmintic agent	Sheep/Cattle	In vitro	Virkel, Lifschitz, Pis, & Lanusee, 2002
Lifibrol	Lipid lowering agent	Dog	In vitro	Walter, & Hsu, 1994
5-Aryl-Thiazolidinedione	Antidiabetic agent	Man/Dog	In vitro	Welch, Kress, Beconi, & Mathre, 2003
Pantoprazole	Proton-pump inhibitor	Rat	In vitro	Masubuchi, Yamazaki, & Tanaka, 1998
Etoposide	Antineoplastic agent	Rat	In vivo	Aso, Yoshioka, & Yasushi, 1990

== Mechanism ==
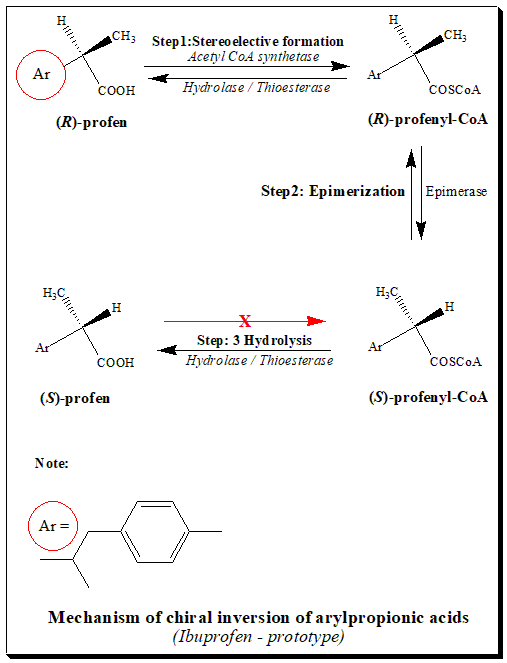
Metabolic inversion - Ibuprofen enantiomers

It is well documented that (R)-enantiomers of profens in the presence of coenzyme A (CoA), adenosine triphosphate (ATP) and Mg^{+2} are converted to active (S)-forms. The pathways of chiral inversion is illustrated taking ibuprofen as the prototype, in the scheme below.

The pathway consists mainly of three steps:

1. Stereoselective activation: Stereoselective activation of (R)-profen by the formation of the thioester, in the presence of CoA, ATP and Mg^{+2}. (S)-profen does not form the thioester.
2. Epimerization (Racemization): The enzyme epimerase 2-arylpropionic-CoA changes the (R)-thioester to the (S)-thioester. This process is called "racemization" or "epimerization."
3. Hydrolysis: With the help of hydrolase/thioesterase, thioesters are broken down into their (R)- and (S)-forms

Because the acyl-CoA thioester (profenyl-CoA) changes the structure of triglycerides and phospholipids, metabolic chiral inversion may cause toxic effects.

== Factors influencing inversion ==
Chiral drugs with stereo-labile configuration are likely to undergo interconversion of the enantiomers that may be enzymatic (biological) or non-enzymatic. Enzyme-mediated conversion is the process of chiral inversion that happens in a living organism. Non-enzymatic inversion of drugs is important and relevant in the pharmaceutical manufacturing process. This may have impact on the shelf-life of a drug and the economic feasibility of the resolution. Inversion can also happen without enzymes when precolumn derivatization is used in enantioselective chromatographic separation techniques. Racemization can also happen in the acidic environment of the stomach and other bodily fluids.

=== Enzyme-mediated (biological) ===
Enzyme-mediated (biological) chiral inversion of organic compounds is caused by highly chiral endogenous molecules found in receptors, enzymes, and other structures. While enzyme inhibitors suppress enzyme activity, enzyme inducers boost enzyme concentration and activity. The primary determinants of inter-individual variability in drug metabolism in humans are thought to include genetic polymorphism and a variety of other variables, including age, gender, biological conditions, pregnancy, illnesses, stress, nutrition, and drugs. For instance, Reichel et al. reported that a 2-arylpropionyl-coenzyme-A epimerase was molecularly cloned and expressed as a crucial enzyme in the inversion metabolism of ibuprofen. Ibuprofen's chiral inversion by enzymes has been documented in humans.

==== Tissue variations ====
The liver, gastrointestinal tract (GIT), lungs, kidney, and brain are among the tissues that participate in the chiral inversion of medicines. The liver has been shown to be the most crucial organ in the development of this mechanism. Although some studies contend that rat liver homogenates lack the enzymatic mechanisms necessary to invert the R-enantiomers of flurbiprofen, naproxen, suprofen, and ibuprofen, the liver may also be involved in the inversion of R-ibuprofen in rats. On the other hand, it was noted that certain medicines underwent chiral inversion without the involvement of the liver (hepatocytes). Although liver did not play a substantial role in the inversion of benoxaprofen, studies using benoxaprofen and ketoprofen show that one of the primary sites of inversion in rats is the GI tract.

== Analytical methods ==
Chiral inversion is a very important part of designing and making drugs. Because this process can change how chiral drugs work in the body and can cause side effects that can be serious or even fatal. Traditionally, chiral inversions have been studied with NMR spectroscopy at different temperatures and chiroptical methods like polarimetry. But strong, complementary methods based on dynamic chromatography (GC, HPLC, SFC, CEC, and MEKC) and electrophoresis have been made and used to figure out how the enantiomeric composition of stereo-labile chiral compounds changes over time. Most of the time, liquid chromatographic methods are used to do enantioselective analysis of chiral drugs. When an analyte with one stereogenic center or axis is separated well, the chromatogram will show two peaks. But if the analyte is stereo-labile, the peaks tend to merge. How much coalescence there is will depend on how fast chiral inversion and enantioresolution happen. Over time, the peaks will merge into a flat area. Dynamic chromatography shows how the elution profile changes over time. This makes it useful for figuring out how pH, temperature, and solvents affect chiral inversion, which can happen on the stationary phase, in the injector, or in the detector.

Multidimensional approaches have been used to improve separation and detection. Table below shows a list of common methods and experiments used to figure out chiral inversion. Any of these methods can then be used to determine chiral inversion. Which instrument is used to analyze a chiral compound depends on its physical and chemical properties (i.e., the solubility, vapor pressure, thermal and solvent stability, and detection).

Instruments and experimental approaches used for investigating stereo-labile compounds
Instrument	Experimental operational approaches
Dynamic NMR	Combining classical kinetic studies with chiral separation
Dynamic gas chromatography	Continuous flow models
Dynamic supercritical fluid chromatography	Peak form analysis - involves comparison of real chromatograms with simulated peaks
Dynamic liquid chromatography	Stopped-flow method
Dynamic capillary electrophoresis	Stochastic methods
Dynamic micellar electrokinetic chromatography	Deconvolution methods
Dynamic capillary electrochromatography	Approximation function methods

For example, capillary electrophoresis or liquid chromatography could be used if the analyte can be ionized and has a high vapor pressure, but it is also soluble in polar solvents. On the other hand, gas chromatography is the best way to test a substance that is stable at high temperatures but has a low vapor pressure. When compared to gas or liquid chromatography, supercritical fluid chromatography is a better way to measure chiral inversion because it uses mass spectrometers and a green method.

== Significance in drug development ==
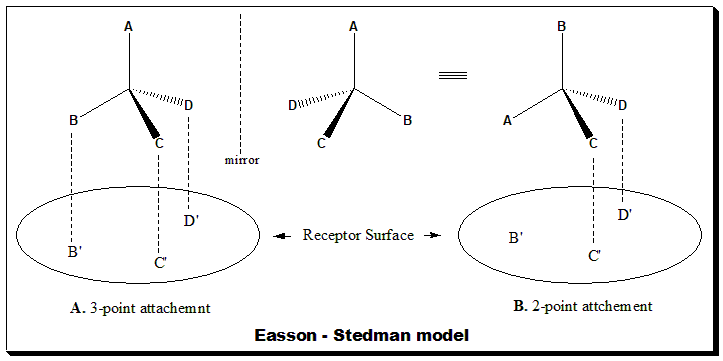
Three-point attachment model

Enantiomers of a chiral drug often interact in an enantioselective way in a chiral environment. This may be offered by different biotic substances (viz. proteins, nucleic acids, phospholipids and oligosaccharides). They are made up of chiral building blocks that are put together in space in handed conformations. These biological targets function as receptors for the drug enantiomers. So, at the binding sites of these receptors, enantiomers will be seen as different chemical species. The three point attachment model (Easson & Stedman model) can be used to see how chiral discrimination works. Figure depicts how the enantiomers of a drug interact with receptors in a way that depends on the drug's shape. This model was made for chiral drugs with a single stereogenic center. It says that there are three binding sites in the receptor (B', C' and D') that match the drug's pharmacophoric groups (B, C, D). A three-point fit (good fit) is possible for the eutomer at BB', CC' and DD'(Fig. A). Even though the distomer is the wrong enantiomer, it can fit either a one-point interaction (bad fit), or a two-point attachment (CC' and DD') with the same receptor site as shown in (Fig. B).

Eutomer is the version that works the way you want it to, and distomer is the version that doesn't work or works in a way you don't want it to. Most of the time, the mirror-image versions have different binding affinities. In the eutomer, the ligands or moiety around a stereogenic element have more binding energy than in the distomer. When the eutomer goes through chiral inversion, it loses its ability to bind to a biological receptor. Because of these enantiospecific interactions, therapeutic and toxicological properties are enantioselective So, the stereo-stability of chiral drugs may have big effects on the process of making new drugs, especially when it comes to how pharmaceutical, pharmacokinetic, and pharmacodynamic information is read and understood. At every stage of designing, making, and testing a drug for safety, chiral inversion must be taken into account.

== See also ==
- Ibuprofen
- Dexibuprofen
- Ketoprofen
- Thalidomide
- Fenoprofen
- Chiral drugs
- Chiral switch
