= Chiral drugs =

Class of drugs

Chemical compounds that come as mirror-image pairs are referred to by chemists as chiral or handed molecules. Each twin is called an enantiomer. Drugs that exhibit handedness are referred to as chiral drugs. Chiral drugs that are equimolar (1:1) mixture of enantiomers are called racemic drugs and these are devoid of optical rotation. The most commonly encountered stereogenic unit, that confers chirality to drug molecules are stereogenic center. Stereogenic center can be due to the presence of tetrahedral tetra coordinate atoms (C,N,P) and pyramidal tricoordinate atoms (N,S). The word chiral describes the three-dimensional architecture of the molecule and does not reveal the stereochemical composition. Hence "chiral drug" does not say whether the drug is racemic (racemic drug), single enantiomer (chiral specific drug) or some other combination of stereoisomers. To resolve this issue Joseph Gal introduced the term unichiral. Unichiral indicates that the stereochemical composition of a chiral drug is homogenous consisting of a single enantiomer.

Many medicinal agents important to life are combinations of mirror-image twins. Despite the close resemblance of such twins, the differences in their biological properties can be profound. In other words, the component enantiomers of a racemic chiral drug may differ wildly in their pharmacokinetic, pharmacodynamic profile. The tragedy of thalidomide illustrates the potential for extreme consequences resulting from the administration of a racemate drug that exhibits multiple effects attributable to individual enantiomers. With the advancements in chiral technology and the increased awareness about three-dimensional consequences of drug action and disposition emerged specialized field "chiral pharmacology". Simultaneously the chirality nomenclature system also evolved.

== History ==
The research into chirality can be traced back to 1812, when physicist Jean-Baptiste Biot found out about a phenomenon called "optical activity." Louis Pasteur, a student of Biot's, made a series of observations that led him to suggest that the optical activity of some substances is caused by their molecular asymmetry, which makes nonsuperimposable mirror-images. In 1848, Pasteur grew two different kinds of crystals from the racemic sodium ammonium salt of tartaric acid. He was the first person to separate enantiomeric crystals by hand. In fact Pasteur laid the foundations of stereochemistry and chirality.

In 1874, Jacobus Henricus van 't Hoff came up with the idea of an asymmetric carbon atom. He said that all optically active carbon compounds have an asymmetric carbon atom. In the same year, Joseph Achille Le Bel only used asymmetry arguments and talked about the asymmetry of the molecules as a whole instead of the asymmetry of each carbon atom. So, Le Bel's idea could be seen as the general theory of stereoisomerism, while van 't Hoff's could be seen as a special case (restricted to tetrahedral carbon).

Scientists started to look into what chiral compounds meant for living things. In 1903, Cushny was the first person to show that enantiomers of a chiral molecule have different biological effects. Lord Kelvin used the word "chiral" for the first time in 1904.

== Terminology and descriptors ==
This is to give an overview of the evolving chirality nomenclature system commonly employed to distinguish enantiomers of a chiral drug. In the beginning, enantiomers were distinguished based on their ability to rotate the plane of plane-polarized light. The enantiomer that rotates the plane-polarized light to the right is named "dextro-rotatory", abbreviated as "dextro" or "d" and the counterpart as "levo" or "l". A racemic mixture is denoted as "(±)", "rac", or "dl". Now the d/l system of naming based on optical rotation is falling into disuse.

Later, the Fischer convention was introduced to specify the configuration of a stereogenic center and uses the symbols D and L. The use of capital letters is to differentiate from the "d" / "l" notation (optical descriptor) described earlier. In this system, the enantiomers are named with reference to D- and L-glyceraldehyde which is taken as the standard for comparison. The structure of the chiral molecule should be represented in the Fischer projection formula. If the hydroxyl group attached to the highest chiral carbon is on the right-hand side it is referred to as D-series and if on the left-hand side it is called L-series. This nomenclature system has also become obsolete. But D-/L-system of naming is still employed to designate the configuration of amino acids and sugars. In general the D/L system of nomenclature is superseded by the Cahn-Ingold-Prelog (CIP) rule to describe the configuration of a stereogenic/chiral center.

In the CIP or R/S convention, or sequence rule, the configuration, spatial arrangements of ligands/substituents around a chiral center, is labeled as either "R" or "S". This convention is now almost worldwide in use and become a part of the IUPAC (International Union of Pure and Applied Chemistry) rules of nomenclature. In this approach: identify the chiral center, label the four atoms directly attached to the stereogenic center in question, assign priorities according to the sequence rule ( from 1 to 4), rotate the molecule until the lowest priority (number 4) substituent is away from the observer/viewer, draw a curve from number 1 to number 2 to number 3 substituent. If the curve is clockwise, the chiral center is of R-absolute configuration, "R" (Latin, rectus = right). If the curve is counterclockwise, the chiral center is of S-absolute configuration, "S" (Latin, sinister = left). Refer to figure, the Cahn-Ingold-Prelog rule.

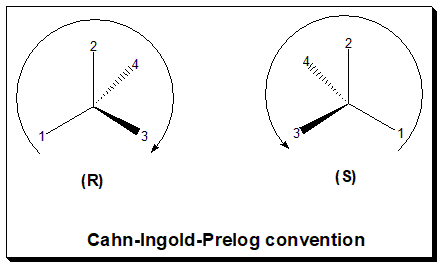
The Cahn-Ingold-Prelog rule

| Chirality descriptor (used as prefix) | Description | Comments |
|---|---|---|
| (+)- / dextro-/ d- | Optical rotation signs; does not reflect the configuration | d; Obsolete terms/falling in disuse |
| (-)- / levo- | Optical rotation signs; does not reflect the configuration | l; Obsolete terms/falling in disuse |
| (±)- / rac- / dl- | Racemate or racemic mixture is an equimolar (1:1) mixture of enantiomers; corresponds to the enantiomeric excess of 0%. | dl; Obsolete terms/falling in disuse |
| D- | Relative configuration with respect to D-glyceraldehyde; referred to as Fischer convention | - |
| L- | Relative configuration with respect to L-glyceraldehyde; referred to as Fischer convention | - |
| R- | Latin: rectus = right; absolute configuration as per Cahn-Ingold-Prelog rule/sequence rule | - |
| S- | Latin: sinister = left; absolute configuration as per Cahn-Ingold-Prelog rule/Sequence rule | - |

== Racemic drugs ==
For many years scientists in drug development were unaware of the three-dimensional consequences of stereochemistry, chiefly due to the lack of technology for making enantioselective investigations. Besides the thalidomide tragedy, another event that raised the importance of issues of stereochemistry in drug research and development was the publication of a manuscript in 1984 entitled, "Stereochemistry, a basis of sophisticated nonsense in pharmacokinetics and clinical pharmacology" by Ariëns. This article, and the series of articles that followed, criticized the practice of conducting pharmacokinetic and pharmacodynamic studies on racemic drugs and ignoring the separate contributions of the individual enantiomers. These papers have served to crystallize some of the important issues surrounding racemic drugs and stimulated much discussion in industry, government, and academia.

=== Chiral pharmacology ===
As a result of these criticisms and the renewed awareness of the three-dimensional effects of drug action fueled by the exponential explosion of chiral technology emerged the new area "stereo-pharmacology". A more specific term is "chiral pharmacology", a phrase popularized by John Caldwell. This field has grown itself into a specialized discipline concerned with the three-dimensional aspects of drug action and disposition. This approach essentially views each version of the chiral twins as separate chemical species. To express the pharmacological activities of each of the chiral twins two technical terms have been coined, eutomer and distomer. The member of the chiral twin that has greater physiological activity is referred to as the eutomer and the other one with lesser activity is referred to as distomer. It is generally understood that this reference is necessarily to a single activity being studied. The eutomer for one effect may well be the distomer when another is studied. The eutomer/distomer ratio is called the eudysmic ratio.

=== Bio-environment and chiral twins ===
The behavior of the chiral twins depends mainly on the nature of the environment (achiral/chiral) in which they are present. An achiral environment does not differentiate the molecular twins whereas a chiral environment does distinguish the left-handed version from the right-handed version. Human body, a classic bio-environment, is inherently handed as it is filled with chiral discriminators like amino acids, enzymes, carbohydrates, lipids, nucleic acids, etc. Hence when a racemic therapeutic gets exposed to biological system the component enantiomers will be acted upon stereoselectively. For drugs, chiral discrimination can take place either in the pharmacokinetic or pharmacodynamic phase.

=== Chiral discrimination ===
Easson and Stedman (1933) advanced a drug-receptor interaction model to account for the differential pharmacodynamic activity between enantiomeric pairs. In this model the more active enantiomer (the eutomer) take part in a minimum of three simultaneous intermolecular interactions with the receptor surface (good fit), Figure. A., where as the less active enantiomer (distomer) interacts at two sites only (bad fit), Figure B. [Refer image for Figure: Easson-Stedman model]. Thus the "fit" of the individual enantiomers to the receptor site differs, as does the energy of interaction. This is a simplistic model but used to explain the biological discrimination between enantiomeric pairs.

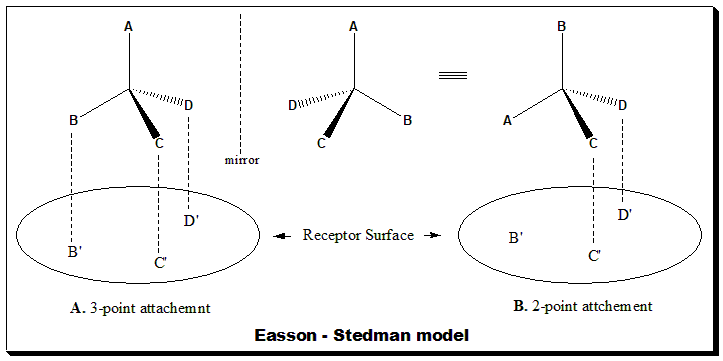
Easson-Stedman model

In reality the drug-receptor interaction is not that simple, but this view of such complex phenomenon has provided major insights into the mechanism of action of drugs.

=== Pharmacodynamic considerations ===
Racemic drugs are not drug combinations in the accepted sense of two or more co-formulated therapeutic agents, but combinations of isomeric substances whose pharmacological activity may reside predominantly in one specific enantiomeric form. In case of stereoselectivity in action only one of the components in the racemic mixture is truly active. The other isomer, the distomer, should be regarded as impurity or isomeric ballast, a term coined by Ariëns, not contributing to the effects aimed at. In contrast to the pharmacokinetic properties of an enantiomeric pair, differences in pharmacodynamic activity tend to be more obvious. There is a wide spectrum of possibilities of distomer actions, many of which are confirmed experimentally. Selected examples of the distomer actions (viz. equipotent, less active, inactive, antagonistic, chiral inversion) are presented in the table below.

| Chiral drug | Stereogenic center(s) | Therapeutic action | Eutomer | Distomer | Distomer action | Reference |
|---|---|---|---|---|---|---|
| promethazine | 1 | Antihistaminic | (R)-/(S)- | - | Equipotent | |
| Salbutamol | 1 | Bronchodilator | (R)- | (S)- | Less active; no serious side-effects | |
| Propranolol | 1 | Antihypertensive | (S)- | (R)- | Inactive; half placebo | |
| Indacrinone | 1 | Diuretic | (R)- | (S)- | Antagonizes side effect of the eutomer | |
| Propoxyphene | 2 | Analgesic; (Dexpropoxyphene) | (2R),(3S)- | (2S),(3R)- | Independent therapeutic value | |
| Propoxyphene | 2 | Antitussive; (Levopropoxyphene) | (2S),(3R)- | (2R),(3S)- | Independent therapeutic value | |
| Ibuprofen | 1 | Anti-inflammatory | (S)- | (R)- | Chiral inversion (unidirectional; [(R)- to (S)-] | |

=== Drug toxicity ===
Since there is a frequent large pharmacokinetic and pharmacodynamic differences between enantiomers of a chiral drug it is not surprising that enantiomers may result in stereoselective toxicity. They can reside in the pharmacologically active enantiomer (eutomer) or in the inactive one (distomer). The toxicologic differences between enantiomers of have also been demonstrated. The following are examples of some of the chiral drugs where their toxic/undesirable side-effects dwell almost in the distomer. This would seem to be a clear cut case of going for a chiral switch.

==== Penicillamine ====
D-(–)-(S)-Penicillamine
(antiarthritic)

L-(+)-(R)-Penicillamine
(toxic)

Penicillamine is a chiral drug with one chiral center and exists as a pair of enantiomers. (S)-penicillamine is the eutomer with the desired antiarthritic activity while the (R)-penicillamine is extremely toxic.

==== Ketamine ====
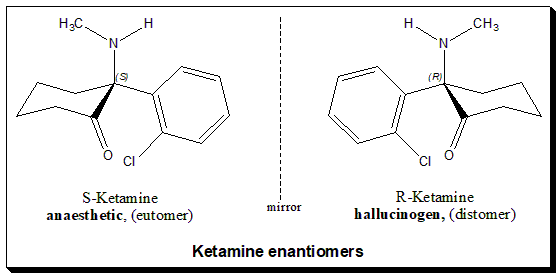
Ketamine enantiomers

Ketamine is a widely used anaesthetic agent. It is a chiral molecule that is administered as a racemate. Studies show that (S)-(+)-ketamine is the active anaesthetic and the undesired side-effects (hallucination and agitation) reside in the distomer, (R)-(-)-ketamine.

==== Dopa ====
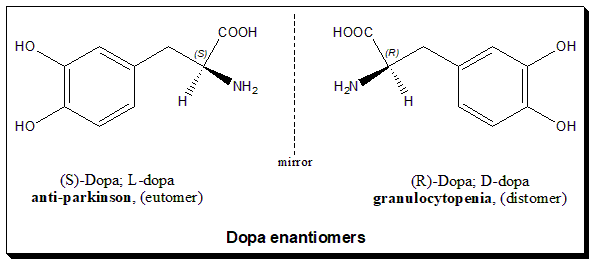
Dopa enantiomers

The initial use of racemic dopa for the treatment of Parkinson's disease resulted in a number of adverse effects viz. nausea, vomiting, anorexia, involuntary movements and granulocytopenia. The use of L-dopa [the (S)-enantiomer] resulted in reducing the required dose, and adverse effects. The granulocytopenia was not observed with the single enantiomer.

==== Ethambutol ====
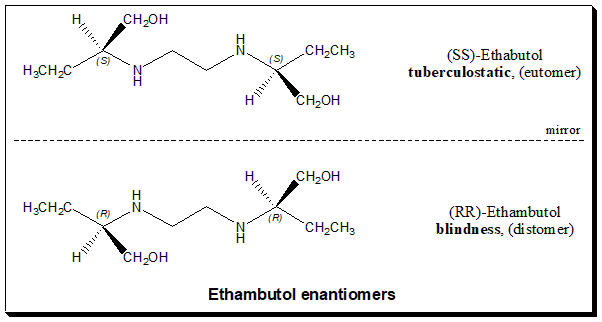
Ethambutol enantiomers

The antitubercular agent Ethambutol contains two constitutionally symmetrical stereogenic centers in its structure and exists in three stereoisomeric forms. An enantiomeric pair (S,S)- and (R,R)-ethambutol, along with the achiral stereoisomer called meso-form, it holds a diastereomeric relationship with the optically active stereoisomers. The activity of the drug resides in the (S,S)-enantiomer which is 500 and 12 fold more potent than the (R,R)-ethambutol and the meso-form. The drug had initially been introduced for clinical use as the racemate and was changed to the (S,S)-enantiomer, as a result of optic neuritis leading to blindness. Toxicity is related to both dose and duration of treatment. All the three stereoisomers were almost equipotent with respect to side effects. Hence the use of S,S)-enantiomer greatly enhanced the risk/benefit ratio.

==== Thalidomide ====
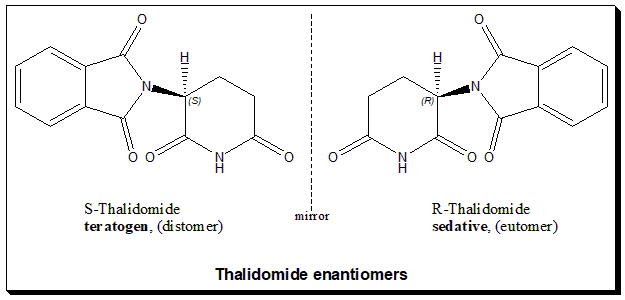
Thalidomide enantiomers

Thalidomide is an example,highlighting the alleged role of chirality in drug toxicity. Thalidomide was a racemic therapeutic and prescribed to pregnant women to control nausea and vomiting. The drug was withdrawn when it became evident that the use in pregnancy causes phocomelia (clinical conditions where babies are born with deformed hand and limbs). Later in late 1970s studies indicated that the (R)- enantiomer is an effective sedative, the (S)-enantiomer harbors teratogenic effect and causes fetal abnormalities. Later studies established that, under biological conditions, the (R)-thalidomide undergoes an in vivo metabolic inversion to the (S)-thalidomide and vice versa. It is a bidirectional chiral inversion.

Chiral drugs: Adverse effects residing in the distomer
| Chiral drug | Chiral centers | Clinical effects | |
|---|---|---|---|
| | | Eutomer; Activity | Distomer; Activity |
| Penicillamine | 1 | (S)-; Antiarthritic | (R)-; Mutagen |
| Ketamine | 1 | (S)-; Anesthetic | (R)-; Hallucinogen |
| Dopa | 1 | (S)-; Antiparkinson | (R)-; Granulocytopenia |
| Ethambutol | 2 | (S,S)-; Tuberculostatic | (R,R)-; and meso- form; Blindness |
| Thalidomide | 1 | (R)-; Sedative | (S)-; Teratogenic |

== Unichiral drugs ==
Unichiral indicates configurationally homogeneous substance (i.e. made up of chiral molecules of one and the same configuration). Other commonly used synonyms are enantiopure drugs and enantiomerically pure drugs.

Monochiral drugs has also been suggested as another synonym, although Professor Eliel, Wilen, and Gal expressed their deep concern over the misuse of the term "homochiral" in articles to denote enantiomerically pure drugs, which is incorrect. Homochiral means objects or molecules of the same handedness. Hence should be used only for comparison of two or more objects of like "chirality". For instance, left hands of different individuals, or say R-naproxen and R-ibuprofen.

Globally drug companies and regulatory agencies have an inclination towards the development of unichiral drugs as a consequence of the increased understanding of the differing biological properties of individual enantiomers of a racemic therapeutics. Most of these unichiral drugs are the consequence of chiral switch approach.

Unichiral drugs employed in drug therapy
| Unichiral drugs | Drug class/ Type of medication | Therapeutic area |
|---|---|---|
| Esomeprazole | Proton pump inhibitor | Gastroenterology |
| S-pantoprazole | Proton pump inhibitor | Gastroenterology |
| Dexrabiprazole | Proton pump inhibitor | Gastroenterology |
| Levosalbutamol | Bronchodilator | Pulmonology |
| Levocetrizine | Antihistaminic | Pulmonology |
| Levofloxacin | Antibacterial | Infectious diseases |
| S-penicillamine | Rheumatoid Arthritis | Rheumatology / Pain/ Inflammation |
| S-etodolac | NSAID | Rheumatology / Pain/ Inflammation |
| Dexketoprofen | NSAID | Rheumatology / Pain/ Inflammation |
| S-ketamine | Anesthetic | Anesthesiology |
| Levobupivacaine | Local anesthetic | Anesthesiology |
| Levothyroxine | Anti-hypothyroidism | Endocrinology |
| Levodopa | Anti-Parkinson | Neuropsychiatry |
| S-amlodipine | Antianginal / Antihypertensive | Cardiology |
| S-metoprolol | Antihypertensive | Cardiology |
| S-atenolol | Antihypertensive | Cardiology |

A company may go in for developing a racemic drug against an enantiomer by providing adequate reasoning. The rationale why a company might pursue developing racemic drugs could include expensive separation of enantiomers, eutomer racemizes in solution (e.g. oxazepam), activities of the enantiomeric pair are different but supplementary, distomer is inactive, but separation is exorbitant. Insignificant/low toxicity of the distomer, high therapeutic index, mutually beneficial, pharmacological activities of both the enantiomers, and if the development of an enantiomer takes huge amount of time for a drug of emergency need e.g., cancer, AIDS, etc.

=== Chiral purity ===
Chiral purity is a measure of the purity of a chiral drug. Other synonyms employed include enantiomeric excess, enantiomer purity, enantiomeric purity, and optical purity. Optical purity is an obsolete term since today most of the chiral purity measurements are done using chromatographic techniques (not based on optical principles). Enantiomeric excess tells the extent (in %) to which the chiral substance contains one enantiomer over the other. For a racemic drug the enantiomeric excess will be 0%. There are number of chiral analysis tools such as polarimetry, NMR spectroscopy with the use of chiral shift reagents, chiral GC (gas chromatography), chiral HPLC (high performance liquid chromatography), chiral TLC (thin-layer chromatography) and other chiral chromatographic techniques, that are employed to evaluate chiral purity. Assessing the purity of a unichiral drug or enantiopure drug is of great importance from a drug safety and efficacy perspective.

== See also ==
- Chiral analysis
- Chiral inversion
- Chiral switch
- Chirality (chemistry)
- Chirality timeline
- Racemate
- Stereochemistry
