= Chiral switch =

Class of drugs

Levofloxacin as an example of a chiral switch

A chiral switch is a chiral drug that has already approved as racemate but has been re-developed as a single enantiomer.

The term chiral switching was introduced by Agranat and Caner in 1999 to describe the development of single enantiomers from racemate drugs. For example, levofloxacin is a chiral switch of racemic ofloxacin.

It is important to understand that chiral switches are treated as a selection invention. A selection invention is an invention that selects a group of new members from a previously known class on the basis of superior properties.

== Description ==
The essential principle of a chiral switch is that there is a change in the status of chirality. In general, the term chiral switch is preferred over racemic switch because the switch is usually happening from a racemic drug to the corresponding single enantiomer.

To express the pharmacological activities of each of the chiral twins of a racemic drug, two technical terms have been coined: eutomer and distomer. The member of the chiral twin that has greater physiological activity is referred to as the eutomer and the other one with lesser activity is referred to as distomer. The eutomer/distomer ratio is called the eudysmic ratio and reflects the degree of enantioselectivity of the biological activity.

In case of stereoselectivity in action, only one of the components in the racemic mixture is truly active (eutomer). The other isomer, the distomer, should be regarded as impurity or isomeric ballast not contributing to the intended effects. It is well documented that the pharmacologically inactive isomer (distomer) may contribute to the toxic or adverse effects of the drugs.

There is a wide spectrum of possibilities of distomer actions, many of which are confirmed experimentally. Sometimes the single enantiomer version lacks certain side-effects that the racemate exhibits. And where the two enantiomers are sufficiently different in pharmacological effects, it may be possible to get a patent on one or both isomers (for instance, as in the case of propoxyphene). The chiral twins of propoxyphene are separately sold by Eli Lilly and company, where dextropropoxyphene is an analgesic agent (Darvon), while levopropoxyphene is an effective antitussive (Novrad). Interestingly the reversed trade names of the drugs, DARVON and NOVRAD, also reflect the chemical mirror-image relationship.

== Concept ==
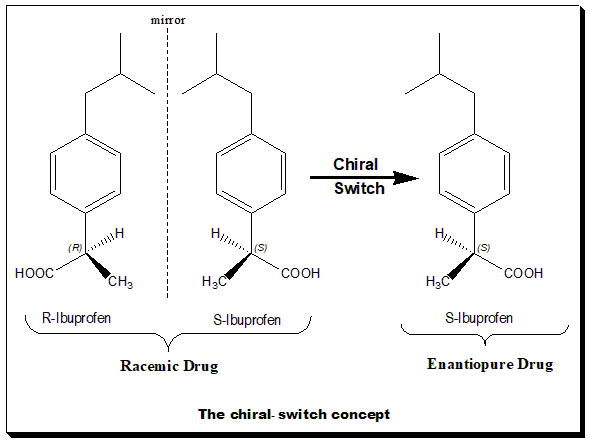
The chiral-switch concept

The chiral switch concept is illustrated in the diagram. This chiral switch is from (±)-ibuprofen to (S)-(+)-ibuprofen (dexibuprofen). The nonsteroidal anti-inflammatory drug (NSAID) ibuprofen was the first chiral drug of the NSAID class to be switched to the single-enantiomer version in 1994. The switch was done based on the fact that the (S)-ibuprofen, the eutomer, was over 100-fold more potent as an inhibitor of cycloxygenase-1 (COX-1) enzyme than (R)-ibuprofen. Moreover, ibuprofen, when administered as the racemate, the active (R)-enantiomer undergoes partial unidirectional chiral inversion (approximately 60%) to the (S)-enantiomer. Therefore, the use of the single (S)-ibuprofen was expected to give faster onset of action at a lower dosage.

Further, while choosing the chiral drug candidate for a chiral switch, one should take a look at the chiral inversion tendency of the molecule. For instance, thalidomide, the sedative drug, undergoes bidirectional chiral inversion or racemization in biological systems. In such cases chiral switching efforts will be pointless.

== Advantages ==
A positive consequence of a chiral switch approach is that it has given a new life to an old drug, minimizing or avoiding the undesirable side-effect profile. Whether to proceed in a chiral switch is normally made on a case-by-case basis. A pragmatic solution could be in favor of a decision-tree approach, incorporating various factors such as pharmacodynamic, pharmacokinetic, toxicological profile of the enantiomers, enantiomer-enantiomer interaction potential, safety, efficacy, risk-benefit ratio, chiral inversion, distomer liability, physicochemical properties, cost of separation and production, quality control criteria, marketing edge, etc.

There are several possible potential benefits to chiral switching or chiral specific drugs. These include:

1. Improved (less complex, more selective) pharmacodynamic profile
2. Higher therapeutic index (improved safety margin)
3. Less complex pharmacokinetic profile, less complex drug interactions
4. Less complex relationship between plasma concentration and effect
5. More rational therapeutic drug monitoring
6. Expose the patient to less body load and thus reduce metabolic/renal/hepatic drug load

The chiral switching approach has sometimes resulted in failures and disappointments.

== Regulatory environment ==
The roles of regulatory agencies also continue to evolve with respect to the development of chiral switches. An interesting concept brought up in the FDA policy is that of "bridging studies". When a sponsor/innovator seeks to develop a single enantiomer from a racemic drug, regulatory agencies will require them to conduct bridging studies. Bridging studies are tests (pharmacological and toxicological evaluations) to connect what is known about the already approved racemate and what is unknown about the single enantiomer under study, without going back to square one as for a completely new molecular entity. The intent of the bridging studies is to make sure that the companies are not scarifying some protective effect conferred by the other isomer when they develop a chiral drug as a single enantiomer rather than as a racemate. A bridging procedure will help to reduce the number of studies required on the new enantiopure drug.

== Examples ==
=== Launched ===
Chiral switching, a re-engineering approach, has enabled in the remarketing of a number of racemic drugs as specific enantiomers. The chiral switching strategy is the way most blockbuster drugs have entered the market as enantiopure drugs. A more appropriate term may be unichiral. But the alternate route is de novo (anew) synthesis of chiral specific drugs. The chiral switches may have the same, very similar, therapeutic indications as the original racemic drug. But, there are instances where new indications for the old drug have been reported. The table below gives a brief list of launched chiral switches.

Racemic drug	Chiral switch (Unichiral drugs)	Pharmacological action	Main benefit(s) claimed
Ibuprofen	(S)-(+)-Ibuprofen; Dexibuprofen	Anti-inflammatory	Faster onset; low adverse effect profile
Ofloxacin	(S)-(-)-Ofloxacin; Levofloxacin	Antibacterial	increased potency
Ketoprofen	(S)-(+)-Ketoprofen; Dexketoprofen	Anti-inflammatory	Faster onset
Salbutamol/ Albuterol	(R)-(-)-Albuterol; Levalbuterol	Bronchodilator	Reduction in side effects; improved tolerability profile
Omeprazole	(S)-(-)-Omepazole; Esomeprazole	Proton pump inhibitor	Increased activation; less variable metabolism
Bupivacaine	(S)-(-)-Bupivacaine; Levobupivacine	Local anesthetic	Decreased risk of cardiotoxicity
Cetirizine	(R)-(-)-Cetirizine; Levocetirizine	Antihistamine	Increased potency; decreased side-effects
Citalopram	(S)-(-)-Citalopram; Escitalopram	Antidepressant	Faster onset of action; reduction in side effects and improved tolerability profile
Ketamine	(S)-(+)-Ketamine; Esketamine	Anesthetic	Increased potency and tolerance; faster recovery

=== Failed/aborted ===
The re-evaluation of single enantiomers is not without problems. The chiral switches of fluoxetine and fenfluramine are classical examples. The development of (R)-fluoxetine was terminated after patients developed abnormal heart rhythms. The chiral switch of fenfluramine, dexfenfluramine, was withdrawn worldwide due to cases of pulmonary hypertension. The table below enumerates some chiral switches that were aborted or withdrawn due to unexpected toxicities.

Racemic drug	Chiral switch	Pharmacological action	Comments
Fluoxetine	(R)-(-)-Fluoxetine	Antidepressant	Significant increase in QT_{C ;} Abnormal heart rhythms; Aborted the program
Fenfluramine	(S)-(+)-Fenfluramine; Dexfenfluramine	Antiobesity	Valvular heart disease and Pulmonary hypertension; withdrawn worldwide,1997.
Labetalol	Dilevalol	Beta blocker	Increased hepatotoxicity
Propranolol	(S)-(-)-Propranolol	Beta blocker	Unexpected reduction of beta-blocking activity

== Evergreening ==
Evergreening refers to the various strategies whereby owners (innovators/sponsors) of pharmaceutical products use patent laws and minor drug modifications to extend their monopoly privileges on the drug. An enantiomer patent is another form of evergreening based on a chiral switch strategy. Single-enantiomer drugs represent more than 50% of the top-selling 100 drugs worldwide. There are some studies which go to suggest that drug companies employ chiral switching for life-cycle management/patent protection of the parent racemic drug and also as a marketing strategy. Pharmaceutical companies support evergreening practices. Some chiral switches are performed to re-start the patent clock for a medication without reducing side effects or improving efficacy. A high price can then continue to be charged for a medication. Examples include citalopram and escitalopram, and omeprazole and esomeprazole. In both these medications, proposed theoretical benefits were used to market the enantiopure drugs, without any clinical trials being conducted to provide evidence that the racemic drugs improved patient centered outcomes.

== Metabolite switches ==
This idea, drug to metabolite switching, is an extension of the chiral switch concept. The purpose of the switching is to develop an active metabolite which will be devoid of the side-effects and have an improved therapeutic profile compared to the parent chiral drug. Some examples of chiral drug to metabolite switches, (those in the market and others under investigation) include terfenadine to fexofenadine, halofantrine to desbutylhalofantrine, and cisapride to norcisapride. A summary is presented in the table below.

Chiral drug	Metabolite switch	Pharmacological action	Main claimed benefit(s)
Terfenadine	Fexofenadine	Antihistaminic	Decreased cardiotoxicity
Halofantrine	Desbutythalofantrine	Antimalarial	Decreased cardiotoxicity
Cisapride	Norcisapride	Prokinetic	Increased efficacy; decreased cardiotoxicity

== Drug repurposing/chiral-switches ==
Drug repurposing and chiral switches are part of the secondary pharmaceuticals strategy. The COVID-19 pandemic has increased drug repurposing and this approach suggests combining the two strategies for better results. This combination strategy is not new, but has not been intentional until now. The combination strategy may improve pharmacology, patents, reduce costs, speed up approval times, and increase regulatory exclusivities. The benefits of the combination strategy include superior pharmacology, stronger patents, shorter approval times, and more exclusivity. Patenting this combination strategy is not considered evergreening, product hopping, or me-too. This perspective calls for a comprehensive search for worldwide-approved racemic drugs to be repurposed and combined with chiral switches.

== See also ==
- Chiral drugs
- Chirality
- Enantiopure drug
- Chiral inversion
- Deuterated drug — a different approach to drug re-development starting from existing drugs
