= Chirality timeline =

This is a timeline of landmark events that unfold the developments happened in the field of chirality.

Many molecules come in two forms that are mirror images of each other, just like our hands. This type of molecule is called chiral. In nature, one of these forms is usually more common than the other. In our cells, one of these mirror images of a molecule fits "like a glove," while the other may be harmful.

In nature, molecules with chirality include hormones, DNA, antibodies, and enzymes. Chiral molecules have the same chemical formula as their mirror molecule, but their spatial orientations are different, which makes a big difference in their biological properties. Chirality affects biochemical reactions, and the way a drug works depends on what kind of enantiomer it is. Many drugs are chiral and it is important that the shape of the drug matches the shape of the cell receptor it is meant to affect. Mismatching will make the drug less effective, which could be a matter of life and death, as happened with thalidomide in the 1960s.

It has long been known that structural factors, particularly chirality and stereochemistry, have a big impact on pharmacological efficacy and pharmacokinetic behavior. Since more than a century ago, pertinent information pertaining to chirality has been accumulating in numerous fields, in particular, physics, chemistry and biology, at an accelerated rate, giving rise to more comprehensive and in-depth reasoning, conceptions, and ideas. This page offers a chronology of significant contributions that have been made in the journey of chirality [1809 to 2021].

== Chirality timeline ==
Timeline of contributions in the field of chirality
Year	Image	Name	Country	Contribution/Achievement	Ref
1809		Étienne-Louis Malus	France	Discovery of plane polarized light; Origin of stereochemistry	
1811		Dominique François Jean Arago	France	Showed how cut crystals change the plane of polarized light	
1812		Jean-Baptiste Biot	France	Found that a quartz plate cut at a right angle to its crystal axis rotates the plane of polarized light by an angle that is proportional to the thickness of the plate. This is the phenomenon of optical rotation	
1815		Jean-Baptiste Biot	France	Applied these ideas to organic substances, like oil of turpentine, sugar, camphor, and tartaric acid (solutions of solids)	
1820		Eilhard Mitscherlich	German	Discovery of the phenomenon of crystallographic isomorphism. Correlated the similarity of crystal shapes with an analogy in chemical composition, reported that sodium ammonium salts of (+)-tartaric acid and racemic acids are completely isomorphous and are identical in all aspects except in optical activity	
1848		Louis Pasteur	France	The racemic sodium ammonium salt of tartaric acid was crystallized, and two different types of crystals were found. First, enantiomers were physically separated	
1857		Louis Pasteur	France	Made the first observation of enantioselectivity in living things	
1874		Jacobus Henricus van't Hoff	Netherlands	Outlined the connection between a molecule's three-dimensional structure, its optical activity, and the idea of asymmetric carbon. Proposed a stereochemical theory of isomerism based on the three-dimensional structure of molecules. Van't Hoff, who won the first Nobel Prize in Chemistry in 1901, for discovery of the laws of chemical dynamics and osmotic pressure in solutions"	
1874		Joseph Achille Le Bel	France	Used asymmetry arguments and talked about the asymmetry of the molecules as a whole instead of the asymmetry of each carbon atom. Le Bel's thought could be considered as the general theory of stereoisomerism.	
1875		Jacobus Henricus van't Hoff	Netherlands	Predicted allenes' stereoisomerism, but it wasn't seen in the lab until 1935	
1890		Hermann Emil Louis Fischer	German	Imagined the fit between the enzyme and the substrate as a lock and key mechanism. He made Fischer projections to show their three-dimensional structures. He was awarded the second Nobel Prize in chemistry, 1902 "in recognition of the extraordinary services he has rendered by his work on sugar and purine syntheses.".	
1890		Poulson		Contributions to the knowledge of the pharmacological group of cocaine	
1894		Ehrlich and Einhorn.		Physiological and toxicological significance of chiral compounds; found (+)-cocaine was more active, started working faster, and lasted less time than (-)-cocaine.	
1903		Arthur Robertson Cushny	United Kingdom	Described how atropine and (-)-hyoscyamine work differently on the papillary, cardiac, and salivary systems and how they affect the spinal cord of a frog; First, gave clear examples of how the biological activity of two enantiomers of a chiral molecule can be different.	
1904		Pictet. and Rotschy		Described the differences in nicotine isomers' toxic doses	
1904		William Thomson	British	The term "chiral" was first used and introduced. Later, Lord Kelvin was made a peer.	
1908		Abderhalden. and Müller		Described (-)- and (+)-epinephrine have very different effects on blood pressure.	
1910		Grove		Nicotine isomers have different levels of toxicity.	
1918		Frey		Reported the isomer of quinine - quinidine, to be more effective in treating dysrhythmias.	
1933		Easson and Stedman		Advanced a thee-point attachment model to explain chiral recognition process between the drug (with a single center of asymmetry) and the receptor or enzyme active site	
1957 1958		Lancelot Law Whyte	Scotland	Rediscovered term chiral	,
1965		Kurt Martin Mislow	United States	Firmly reintroduced the term chirality into stereochemical literature; German-born American organic chemist	
1956/1966		Robert Sidney Cahn	British	Devised R/S and E/Z notations; Cahn–Ingold–Prelog priority rules	
1956/1966		Christopher Kelk Ingold	British	Co-author of Cahn–Ingold–Prelog priority rules; Did groundbreaking work (between 1920-30s) on reaction mechanisms and the electronic structure of organic compounds	
1956/1966		Vladimir Prelog	Sarajevo	Co-author of the Cahn–Ingold–Prelog priority rules	
1975		Vladimir Prelog	Sarajevo	Nobel prize in chemistry for his research into the stereochemistry of organic molecules and reaction	
1975		John Cornforth	Australia	Awarded Nobel prize for his work on the stereochemistry of enzyme-catalyzed reactions	
2001		William Standish Knowles	United States	Won Nobel prize in chemistry in 2001 for his work on the development of catalytic asymmetric synthesis (chirally catalyzed hydrogenation reactions	
2001		Ryōji Noyori	Japan	Won Nobel prize in chemistry in 2001 for his work on the development of catalytic asymmetric synthesis (chirally catalyzed hydrogenation reactions)	
2001		Karl Barry Sharpless	United States	Won Nobel prize in chemistry in 2001 for his work on the development of catalytic asymmetric synthesis (chirally catalyzed oxidation reactions)	
2021		Benjamin List	German	Awarded Nobel Prize in Chemistry in 2021 for his work on the development of asymmetric organocatalysis	
2021		David MacMillan	United Kingdom United States	Awarded Nobel Prize in Chemistry in 2021 for his work on the development of asymmetric organocatalysis	
2026		Henri B. Kagan	France	Awarded Nobel Prize in Chemistry in 2026 for the discovery of non-linear effects and autocatalysis in asymmetric organic synthesis	
2026		Kensō Soai	Japan	Awarded Nobel Prize in Chemistry in 2026 for the discovery of non-linear effects and autocatalysis in asymmetric organic synthesis	

== See also ==
- Chirality
- Chiral drugs
- Stereochemistry
- Timeline of chemistry
- List of Nobel Laureates in chemistry
