= Dexibuprofen =

Enantiomer of ibuprofen used as a NSAID drug

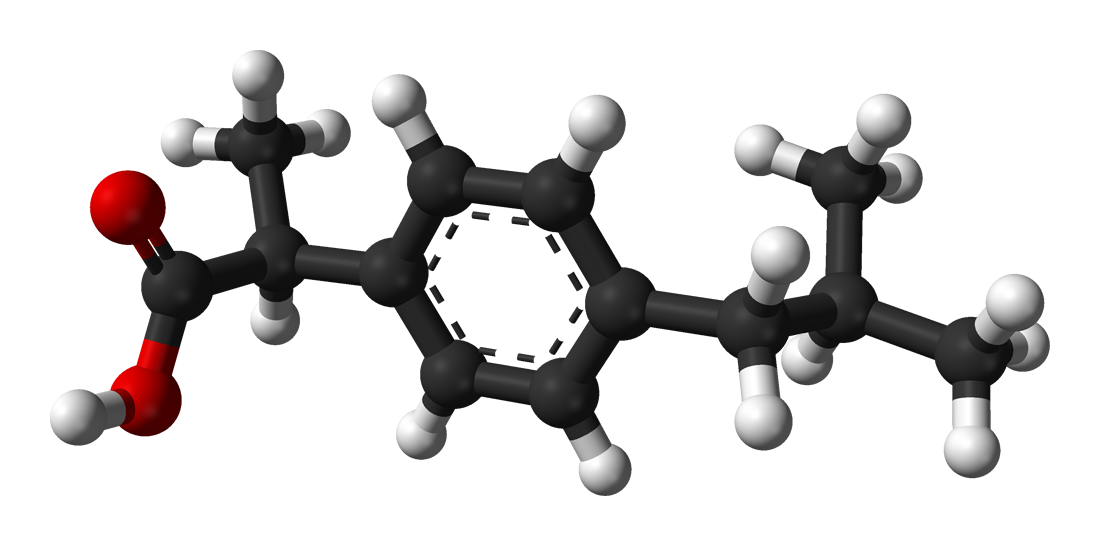

Clinical data
- Trade names: Seractil, Deltaran, Ibusoft, Monactil
- Other names: S(+)Ibuprofen
- AHFS/Drugs.com: International Drug Names
- Routes of administration: Oral
- ATC code: M01AE14 (WHO)

Identifiers
- IUPAC name: (2S)-2-[4-(2-methylpropyl)phenyl]propanoic acid
- CAS Number: 51146-56-6
- PubChem CID: 39912
- ChemSpider: 36498
- UNII: 671DKG7P5S
- KEGG: D03715
- ChEBI: CHEBI:43415
- ChEMBL: ChEMBL175
- CompTox Dashboard (EPA): DTXSID9048724
- ECHA InfoCard: 100.106.960

Chemical and physical data
- Formula: C_{13}H_{18}O_{2}
- Molar mass: 206.285 g·mol^{−1}
- 3D model (JSmol): Interactive image
- SMILES: C[C@@H](c1ccc(cc1)CC(C)C)C(=O)O
- InChI: InChI=1S/C13H18O2/c1-9(2)8-11-4-6-12(7-5-11)10(3)13(14)15/h4-7,9-10H,8H2,1-3H3,(H,14,15)/t10-/m0/s1; Key:HEFNNWSXXWATRW-JTQLQIEISA-N

Dexibuprofen is a nonsteroidal anti-inflammatory drug (NSAID). It is the active dextrorotatory enantiomer of ibuprofen. Most ibuprofen formulations, as well as other drugs of the profen drug class, contain a racemic mixture of both isomers.

Dexibuprofen is a chiral switch of racemic ibuprofen. The chiral carbon in dexibuprofen is assigned an absolute configuration of (S) per the Cahn–Ingold–Prelog rules. Dexibuprofen is also called (S)-(+)-ibuprofen.

Ibuprofen is an α-arylpropionic acid used largely in the treatment of rheumatoid arthritis and widely used over-the counter drug for headache and minor pains. This drug has a chiral center and exists as a pair of enantiomers. (S)-Ibuprofen, the eutomer, is responsible for the desired therapeutic effect. The inactive (R)-enantiomer, the distomer, undergoes a unidirectional chiral inversion to give the active (S)-enantiomer, the former acting as a prodrug for the latter. That is, when the ibuprofen is administered as a racemate the distomer is converted in vivo into the eutomer while the latter is unaffected.

== See also ==
- Chiral switch
- Enantiopure drug
- Chirality
- Eudysmic ratio
- Ibuprofen
