= Indacrinone =

Chemical compound

Identifiers
- IUPAC name: [(6,7-Dichloro-2-methyl-1-oxo-2-phenyl-2,3-dihydro-1H-inden-5-yl)oxy]acetic acid
- CAS Number: 56049-88-8
- PubChem CID: 42266
- ChemSpider: 38545
- UNII: B926Y9U4QN
- CompTox Dashboard (EPA): DTXSID60866624
- ECHA InfoCard: 100.054.496

Chemical and physical data
- Formula: C_{18}H_{14}Cl_{2}O_{4}
- Molar mass: 365.21 g·mol^{−1}
- 3D model (JSmol): Interactive image
- SMILES: CC1(Cc2cc(c(c(c2C1=O)Cl)Cl)OCC(=O)O)c3ccccc3
- InChI: InChI=1S/C18H14Cl2O4/c1-18(11-5-3-2-4-6-11)8-10-7-12(24-9-13(21)22)15(19)16(20)14(10)17(18)23/h2-7H,8-9H2,1H3,(H,21,22); Key:PRKWVSHZYDOZLP-UHFFFAOYSA-N

Indacrinone is a loop diuretic. It can be used in patients of gout with hypertension as an antihypertensive because it decreases reabsorption of uric acid, while other diuretics increase it.

== Chirality and biological activity ==
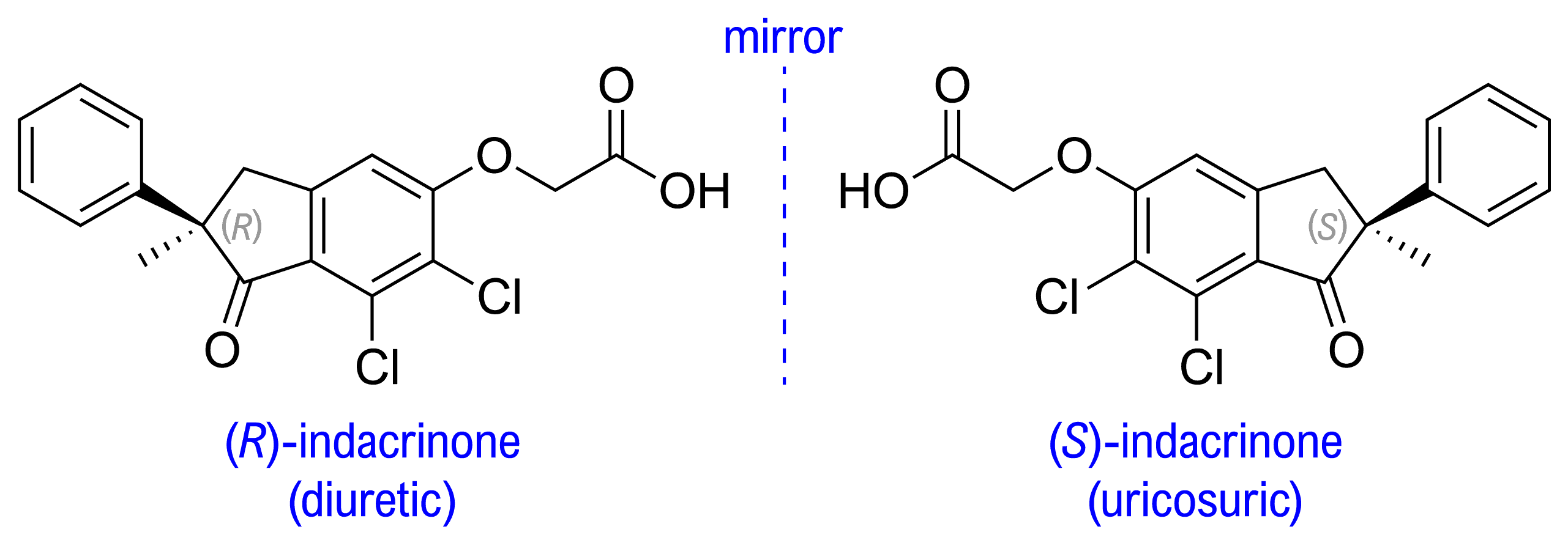
Indacrinone - Chiral twins

Indacrinone is a chiral drug, with one chiral center and hence exists as mirror-image twins. (R)-enantiomer, the eutomer, is diuretic whereas the mirror-image version (S)-enantiomer counteracts side effect of the eutomer. Here both the enantiomers contribute to the overall desired effect in different ways.

As indicated earlier, the (R)- enantiomer is the pharmacologically active diuretic. Like most other diuretics, the (R)-isomer possesses an undesirable side-effect of retaining uric acid. But the (S)-enantiomer, the distomer, has the property of assisting uric acid secretion (uricosuric effect), and, therefore, antagonizing the undesirable side-effects of the eutomer (uric-acid retention). It affords a good argument for the marketing of a racemic mixture. But studies exemplify that 9:1 mixture of the two enantiomers provides optimal therapeutic value.

== Synthesis ==
ChemDrug Synthesis: Patent: Use patent: Enantioselective method:

The Friedel-Crafts acylation of 2,3-dichloroanisole [1984-59-4] (1) with phenylacetyl chloride [103-80-0] (2) gives 2,3-dichloro-4-phenylacetylanisole [59043-83-3] (3). A variation of the Mannich reaction is performed employing tetramethyldiaminomethane [51-80-9] (this is an aminal of dimethylamine and formaldehyde). The intermediate reaction product (5), which is not isolated, would undergo a β-Hydride elimination with concomitant loss of dimethylamine and formation of the corresponding enone, 2,3-Dichloro-4-(2-phenylacryloyl)anisole (PC10924810) (6). Acid catalyzed (H_{2}SO_{4}) intramolecular cyclization gives the indanone (PC10990444) (7). This is O-demethylated under acidic conditions to give 2-Phenyl-5-hydroxy-6,7-dichloro-1-indanone, PC12774089 (8). The phenol thus obtained is then alkylated on oxygen by iodoacetic acid [64-69-7] (9) affording PC20520826 (10). Alkylation with iodomethane [74-88-4] in the presence of sodium hydride completed the synthesis of indacrinone (11).

== See also ==
- Chiral drugs
- Chirality
- Eudisimic ratio
