= Levofloxacin =

Antibiotic

Clinical data
- Trade names: Levaquin, others
- Other names: L-Ofloxacin; (S)-Ofloxacin; (–)-Ofloxacin; DR-3355; DR3355; RWJ-25213; RWJ25213; HR-355; HR355; LVX; LVFX
- AHFS/Drugs.com: Monograph
- MedlinePlus: a697040
- License data: US DailyMed: Levofloxacin
- Routes of administration: Oral, intravenous (IV), eye drops
- Drug class: Fluoroquinolone
- ATC code: J01MA12 (WHO) S01AE05 (WHO) A02BD10 (WHO) J01RA05 (WHO)

Legal status
- Legal status: CA: ℞-only; US: ℞-only; EU: Rx-only; In general: ℞ (Prescription only)

Pharmacokinetic data
- Bioavailability: 99%
- Protein binding: 24–38%
- Metabolism: Minimal (<5%)
- Metabolites: • Desmethyllevofloxacin • Levofloxacin-N-oxide
- Onset of action: 1.1–1.7 hours (T_{max})
- Elimination half-life: 6.0–8.8 hours
- Excretion: Urine: 87% unchanged, <5% metabolites Feces: <4%

Identifiers
- IUPAC name: (S)-9-fluoro-2,3-dihydro-3-methyl-10-(4-methylpiperazin-1-yl)-7-oxo-7H-pyrido[1,2,3-de]-1,4-benzoxazine-6-carboxylic acid
- CAS Number: 100986-85-4
- PubChem CID: 149096
- DrugBank: DB01137
- ChemSpider: 131410
- UNII: RIX4E89Y14
- KEGG: D08120; C07660
- ChEBI: CHEBI:63598
- ChEMBL: ChEMBL33
- NIAID ChemDB: 002307
- PDB ligand: LFX (PDBe, RCSB PDB)
- CompTox Dashboard (EPA): DTXSID0041060
- ECHA InfoCard: 100.115.581

Chemical and physical data
- Formula: C_{18}H_{20}FN_{3}O_{4}
- Molar mass: 361.373 g·mol^{−1}
- 3D model (JSmol): Interactive image
- Density: 1.5 ± 0.1 g/cm^{3}
- SMILES: C[C@H]1COc2c3n1cc(c(=O)c3cc(c2N4CCN(CC4)C)F)C(=O)O
- InChI: InChI=1S/C18H20FN3O4/c1-10-9-26-17-14-11(16(23)12(18(24)25)8-22(10)14)7-13(19)15(17)21-5-3-20(2)4-6-21/h7-8,10H,3-6,9H2,1-2H3,(H,24,25)/t10-/m0/s1; Key:GSDSWSVVBLHKDQ-JTQLQIEISA-N

Levofloxacin, sold under the brand name Levaquin among others, is a broad-spectrum antibiotic of the fluoroquinolone drug class. It is the left-handed isomer of the medication ofloxacin. It is used to treat a number of bacterial infections including acute bacterial sinusitis, pneumonia, H. pylori (in combination with other medications), urinary tract infections, Legionnaires' disease, chronic bacterial prostatitis, and some types of gastroenteritis. Along with other antibiotics it may be used to treat tuberculosis, meningitis, or pelvic inflammatory disease. It is available orally, intravenously, and in eye drop form.

Common side effects include nausea, diarrhea, and trouble sleeping. A warning concerning all fluoroquinolones was issued in 2016: "An FDA safety review has shown that fluoroquinolones when used systemically (i.e. tablets, capsules, and injectable) are associated with disabling and potentially permanent serious adverse effects that can occur together. These adverse effects can involve the tendons, muscles, joints, nerves, and central nervous system."

Other serious side effects may include tendon rupture, tendon inflammation, seizures, psychosis, and potentially permanent peripheral nerve damage. Tendon damage may appear months after treatment is completed. People may also sunburn more easily. In people with myasthenia gravis, muscle weakness and breathing problems may worsen. While use during pregnancy is not recommended, risk appears to be low. The use of other medications in this class appear to be safe while breastfeeding; however, the safety of levofloxacin is unclear.

Levofloxacin was patented in 1985 and approved for medical use in the United States in 1996. It is on the World Health Organization's List of Essential Medicines. It is available as a generic medication. In 2023, it was the 231st most commonly prescribed medication in the United States, with more than 1 million prescriptions.

== Medical uses ==
Levofloxacin is used to treat infections including: respiratory tract infections, cellulitis, urinary tract infections, prostatitis, anthrax, endocarditis, meningitis, pelvic inflammatory disease, traveler's diarrhea, tuberculosis, and plague and is available orally, intravenously, and in eye drop form.

As of 2016, the US Food and Drug Administration (FDA) recommended that "serious side effects associated with fluoroquinolone antibacterial drugs generally outweigh the benefits for patients with acute sinusitis, acute bronchitis, and uncomplicated urinary tract infections who have other treatment options. For patients with these conditions, fluoroquinolones should be reserved for those who do not have alternative treatment options."

Levofloxacin is used for the treatment of pneumonia, urinary tract infections, and abdominal infections. As of 2007 the Infectious Disease Society of America (IDSA) and the American Thoracic Society recommended levofloxacin and other respiratory fluoroquinolines as first line treatment for community acquired pneumonia when co-morbidities such as heart, lung, or liver disease are present or when in-patient treatment is required. Levofloxacin also plays an important role in recommended treatment regimens for ventilator-associated and healthcare-associated pneumonia.

As of 2010 it was recommended by the IDSA as a first-line treatment option for catheter-associated urinary tract infections in adults. In combination with metronidazole it is recommended as one of several first-line treatment options for adult patients with community-acquired intra-abdominal infections of mild-to-moderate severity. The IDSA also recommends it in combination with rifampicin as a first-line treatment for prosthetic joint infections. The American Urological Association recommends levofloxacin as a first-line treatment to prevent bacterial prostatitis when the prostate is biopsied. and as of 2004 it was recommended to treat bacterial prostatitis by the NIH research network studying the condition.

Levofloxacin and other fluoroquinolones have also been widely used for the treatment of uncomplicated community-acquired respiratory and urinary tract infections, indications for which major medical societies generally recommend the use of older, narrower spectrum drugs to avoid fluoroquinolone resistance development. Due to its widespread use, common pathogens such as Escherichia coli and Klebsiella pneumoniae have developed resistance. In many countries as of 2013, resistance rates among healthcare-associated infections with these pathogens exceeded 20%.

Levofloxacin is also used as antibiotic eye drops to prevent bacterial infection. Usage of levofloxacin eye drops, along with an antibiotic injection of cefuroxime or penicillin during cataract surgery, has been found to lower the chance of developing endophthalmitis, compared to eye drops or injections alone.

=== Pregnancy and breastfeeding ===
According to the FDA approved prescribing information, levofloxacin is pregnancy category C. This designation indicates that animal reproduction studies have shown adverse effects on the fetus and there are no adequate and well-controlled studies in humans, but the potential benefit to the mother may in some cases outweigh the risk to the fetus. Available data point to a low risk for the unborn child. Exposure to quinolones, including levofloxacin, during the first-trimester is not associated with an increased risk of stillbirths, premature births, birth defects, or low birth weight.

Levofloxacin does penetrate into breastmilk, though the concentration of levofloxacin in the breastfeeding infant is expected to be low. Due to potential risks to the baby, the manufacturer does not recommend that nursing mothers take levofloxacin. However, the risk appears to be very low, and levofloxacin can be used in breastfeeding mothers with proper monitoring of the infant, combined with delaying breastfeeding for 4–6 hours after taking levofloxacin.

=== Children ===
Levofloxacin is not approved in most countries for the treatment of children except in unique and life-threatening infections because it is associated with an elevated risk of musculoskeletal injury in this population, a property it shares with other fluoroquinolones.

In the United States levofloxacin is approved for the treatment of anthrax and plague in children over six months of age.

Levofloxacin is recommended by the Pediatric Infectious Disease Society and the Infectious Disease Society of America as a first-line treatment for pediatric pneumonia caused by penicillin-resistant Streptococcus pneumoniae, and as a second-line agent for the treatment of penicillin-sensitive cases.

In one study, 1534 juvenile patients (age 6 months to 16 years) treated with levofloxacin as part of three efficacy trials were followed up to assess all musculoskeletal events occurring up to 12 months post-treatment. At 12 months follow-up the cumulative incidence of musculoskeletal adverse events was 3.4%, compared to 1.8% among 893 patients treated with other antibiotics. In the levafloxacin-treated group, approximately two-thirds of these musculoskeletal adverse events occurred in the first 60 days, 86% were mild, 17% were moderate, and all resolved without long-term sequelae.

=== Spectrum of activity ===
Levofloxacin and later generation fluoroquinolones are collectively referred to as "respiratory quinolones" to distinguish them from earlier fluoroquinolones which exhibited modest activity toward the important respiratory pathogen Streptococcus pneumoniae.

The drug exhibits enhanced activity against the important respiratory pathogen Streptococcus pneumoniae relative to earlier fluoroquinolone derivatives like ciprofloxacin. For this reason, it is considered a "respiratory fluoroquinolone" along with more recently developed fluoroquinolones such as moxifloxacin and gemifloxacin. It is less active than ciprofloxacin against Gram-negative bacteria, especially Pseudomonas aeruginosa, and lacks the anti-methicillin-resistant Staphylococcus aureus (MRSA) activity of moxifloxacin and gemifloxacin. Levofloxacin has shown moderate activity against anaerobes, and is about twice as potent as ofloxacin against Mycobacterium tuberculosis and other mycobacteria, including Mycobacterium avium complex.

Its spectrum of activity includes most strains of bacterial pathogens responsible for respiratory, urinary tract, gastrointestinal, and abdominal infections, including Gram negative (Escherichia coli, Haemophilus influenzae, Klebsiella pneumoniae, Legionella pneumophila, Moraxella catarrhalis, Proteus mirabilis, and Pseudomonas aeruginosa), Gram positive (methicillin-sensitive but not methicillin-resistant Staphylococcus aureus, Streptococcus pneumoniae, Staphylococcus epidermidis, Enterococcus faecalis, and Streptococcus pyogenes), and atypical bacterial pathogens (Chlamydophila pneumoniae and Mycoplasma pneumoniae). Compared to earlier antibiotics of the fluoroquinoline class such as ciprofloxacin, levofloxacin exhibits greater activity towards Gram-positive bacteria but lesser activity toward Gram-negative bacteria, especially Pseudomonas aeruginosa.

=== Resistance ===
Resistance to fluoroquinolones is common in staphylococcus and pseudomonas. Resistance occurs in multiple ways. One mechanism is by an alteration in topoisomerase IV enzyme. A double mutant form of S. pneumoniae Gyr A + Par C bearing Ser-81-->Phe and Ser-79-->Phe mutations were eight to sixteen times less responsive to ciprofloxacin.

== Contraindications ==
Package inserts mention that levofloxacin is to be avoided in patients with a known hypersensitivity to levofloxacin or other quinolones.

Like all fluoroquinolines, levofloxacin is contraindicated in patients with epilepsy or other seizure disorders, and in patients who have a history of quinolone-associated tendon rupture.

Levofloxacin may prolong the QT interval in some people, especially the elderly, and levofloxacin should not be used for people with a family history of long QT syndrome, or who have long QT, chronic low potassium, or are prescribed other drugs that prolong the QT interval.

A 2011 review examining musculoskeletal complications of fluoroquinolones proposed guidelines with respect to administration to athletes, that called for avoiding all use of fluoroquinolone antibiotics if possible, and if they are used: ensure there is informed consent about the musculoskeletal risks, and inform coaching staff; do not use any corticosteroids if fluoroquinolones are used; consider dietary supplements of magnesium and antioxidants during treatment; reduce training until the course of antibiotic is finished and then carefully increase back to normal; and monitor for six months after the course is finished, and stop all athletic activity if symptoms emerge.

== Adverse effects ==
Adverse effects are typically mild to moderate. However, severe, disabling, and potentially irreversible adverse effects sometimes occur, and for this reason it is recommended that use of fluoroquinolones be limited.

Prominent among these are adverse effects that became the subject of a black box warning by the FDA in 2016. The FDA wrote: "An FDA safety review has shown that fluoroquinolones when used systemically (i.e. tablets, capsules, and injectable) are associated with disabling and potentially permanent serious adverse effects that can occur together. These adverse effects can involve the tendons, muscles, joints, nerves, and central nervous system." Rarely, tendinitis or tendon rupture may occur due to fluoroquinolone antibiotics, including levofloxacin. Such injuries, including tendon rupture, has been observed up to six months after cessation of treatment; higher doses of fluoroquinolones, being elderly, transplant patients, and those with a current or historical corticosteroid use are at elevated risk. The US label for levofloxacin also contains a black box warning for the exacerbation of the symptoms of the neurological disease myasthenia gravis. Similarly, the United Kingdom Medicines and Healthcare Products Regulatory Agency (MHRA) recommendations warn of rare but disabling and potentially irreversible adverse effects, and to recommend limiting use of these drugs. Increasing age and corticosteroid use appears to increase the risk of musculoskeletal complications.

A wide variety of other uncommon but serious adverse events have been associated with fluoroquinolone use, with varying degrees of evidence supporting causation. These include anaphylaxis, hepatotoxicity, central nervous system effects including seizures and psychiatric effects, prolongation of the QT interval, blood glucose disturbances, and photosensitivity, among others. Levofloxacin may produce fewer of these rare serious adverse effects than other fluoroquinolones.

There is some disagreement in the medical literature regarding whether and to what extent levofloxacin and other fluoroquinolones produce serious adverse effects more frequently than other broad spectrum antibacterial drugs.

Concerning more usual adverse effects, in pooled results from 7,537 patients exposed to levofloxacin in 29 clinical trials, 4.3% discontinued treatment due to adverse drug reactions. The most common adverse reactions leading to discontinuation were gastrointestinal, including nausea, vomiting, and constipation. Overall, 7% of patients experienced nausea, 6% headache, 5% diarrhea, and 4% insomnia, along with other adverse reactions experienced at lower rates.

Administration of levofloxacin or other broad-spectrum antibiotics is associated with Clostridioides difficile associated diarrhea which may range in severity from mild diarrhea to fatal colitis. Fluoroquinolone administration may be associated with the acquisition and outgrowth of a particularly virulent Clostridioides strain.

More research is needed to determine the best dose and length of treatment.

== Overdose ==
Overdosing experiments in animals showed loss of body control and drooping, difficulty breathing, tremors, and convulsions. Doses in excess of 1500 mg/kg orally and 250 mg/kg IV produced significant mortality in rodents.

In the event of an acute overdosage, authorities recommend unspecific standard procedures such as emptying the stomach, observing the patient and maintaining appropriate hydration. Levofloxacin is not efficiently removed by hemodialysis or peritoneal dialysis.

== Interactions ==
Levofloxacin undergoes minimal metabolism (<5%) and as such is unlikely to be affected by enzyme inhibitors and inducers.

Unlike ciprofloxacin, levofloxacin does not appear to inhibit the cytochrome P450 enzyme CYP1A2. Therefore, drugs that are metabolized by this enzyme, like theophylline, do not interact with levofloxacin. Levofloxacin is a weak inhibitor of CYP2C9, suggesting potential to block the breakdown of warfarin and phenprocoumon. This can result in more action of drugs like warfarin, leading to more potential side effects, such as bleeding. However, clinical study found no significant interactions between levofloxacin and warfarin. Nonetheless, levofloxacin has been reported to enhance the effects of warfarin in post-marketing reports.

The use of nonsteroidal anti-inflammatory drugs (NSAIDs) in combination with fluoroquinolines like levofloxacin may lead to excessive central nervous system (CNS) stimulation and seizures. Examples of NSAIDs include ibuprofen, naproxen, and aspirin, among others.

When levofloxacin is taken with antiacids containing magnesium hydroxide, aluminum hydroxide, or sucralfate, the two combine to form insoluble salts that are difficult to absorb from the intestines. Peak serum levels of levofloxacin may be reduced by 90% or more, which can prevent the drug from being effective. Similar results have been reported when levofloxacin is taken with metal cations like iron supplements and multivitamins containing zinc or didanosine. A minimum separation of 2 hours is recommended.

Probenicid and cimetidine have been found to reduce the renal clearance of levofloxacin, its main route of elimination, by 35% and 24%, respectively. Relatedly, probenicid and cimetidine have been found to increase the area-under-the-curve (AUC) levels and elimination half-life of levofloxacin, whereas peak levels of levofloxacin were unaffected. Co-administration of probenicid or cimetidine with levofloxacin does not require dosage adjustment.

== Pharmacology ==
=== Pharmacodynamics ===
Levofloxacin is a broad-spectrum antibiotic that is active against both Gram-positive and Gram-negative bacteria. Like all quinolones, it functions by inhibiting the DNA gyrase and topoisomerase IV, two bacterial type IIA topoisomerases. Topoisomerase IV is necessary to separate DNA that has been replicated (doubled) prior to bacterial cell division. With the DNA not being separated, the process is stopped, and the bacterium cannot divide. DNA gyrase, on the other hand, is responsible for supercoiling the DNA, so that it will fit in the newly formed cells. Both mechanisms amount to killing the bacterium. Levofloxacin acts as a bactericide.

Levofloxacin may act as a GABA_{A} receptor antagonist or negative allosteric modulator and this may be responsible for its central nervous system (CNS) adverse effects such as seizures. On the other hand, one study suggested that the convulsions induced by fluoroquinolines may be more associated with glutamate and/or GABA_{B} receptors than with the GABA_{A} receptor. As of 2011, the mechanism of action of levofloxacin's musculoskeletal complications was not clear. Levofloxacin and other fluoroquinolones show human ether-à-go-go-related gene (hERG) inhibition. This is thought to be responsible for their QT prolongation.

=== Pharmacokinetics ===
==== Absorption ====
Levofloxacin is rapidly and completely absorbed with oral administration. The oral bioavailability of levofloxacin is 99%. The time to peak levels of levofloxacin with oral administration is on average 1.1 to 1.7 hours. Taking oral levofloxacin with food has been found to delay the time to peak levels by 1 hours and to reduce peak levels by 14 to 25%. As such, levofloxacin can be taken without regard to food. Steady-state levels of levofloxacin with oral intake are reached within 48 hours of once-daily administration. Levofloxacin exposure is similar with oral and intravenous routes. As such, these routes are considered to be interchangeable. The pharmacokinetics of levofloxacin are linear and predictable with both oral and intravenous administration.

==== Distribution ====
The volume of distribution of levofloxacin is 74 to 112 L. As such, it is widely distributed into tissues. Peak levels in skin and blister tissues are reached approximately 3 hours after administration. The ratio of levofloxacin levels in skin versus plasma is 2:1 and in blister versus plasma is 1:1. Levels of levofloxacin in lung tissue are 2- to 5-fold higher than plasma levels. The plasma protein binding of levofloxacin is 24 to 38% and is independent of concentration.

==== Metabolism ====
Levofloxacin undergoes minimal metabolism and is excreted largely unchanged. Less than 5% of an oral dose of levofloxacin is excreted in urine as metabolites. Only two metabolites of levofloxacin have been detected: desmethyllevofloxacin and levofloxacin-N-oxide. Neither of these metabolites appear to have relevant pharmacological activity. The specific enzymes responsible for the metabolism of levofloxacin and generation of its metabolites have not been determined. Levofloxacin does not metabolically invert into its enantiomer D-ofloxacin.

==== Elimination ====
Levofloxacin given orally is excreted 87% unchanged in urine within 48 hours and less than 4% is eliminated in feces within 72 hours. Less than 5% of a dose of levofloxacin is excreted in urine as its metabolites desmethyllevofloxacin and levofloxacin-N-oxide. The elimination half-life of levofloxacin is on average 6.0 to 8.8 hours whether given in single or multiple doses and whether used orally or intravenously.

== Chemistry ==
Like all fluoroquinolones, levofloxacin is a fluorinated quinolone carboxylic acid. It is a chiral molecule and the pure (−)-(S)-enantiomer of the racemic drug ofloxacin. This enantiomer binds more effectively to the DNA gyrase enzyme and to topoisomerase IV than its (+)-(R)-counterpart. Levofloxacin is referred to as a chiral switch: These are chiral drugs that have already been patent claimed, approved and marketed as racemates (or as mixtures of diastereomers but have since been redeveloped as pure enantiomers. Distinct functional groups on this molecules include a hydroxyl group, carbonyl group, and an aromatic ring.

The substance is used as the hemihydrate, which has the empirical formula C_{18}H_{20}FN_{3}O_{4}·½H_{2}O and a molecular mass of 370.38 g/mol. Levofloxacin is a light-yellowish-white to yellow-white crystal or crystalline powder. A major issue in the synthesis of levofloxacin is identifying correct entries into the benzoxazine core in order to produce the correct chiral form.

== History ==
Levofloxacin is a third-generation fluoroquinolone, being one of the isomers of ofloxacin, which was a broader-spectrum conformationally locked analog of norfloxacin; both ofloxacin and levofloxaxin were synthesized and developed by scientists at Daiichi Seiyaku. The Daiichi scientists knew that ofloxacin was racemic, but tried unsuccessfully to separate the two isomers; in 1985 they succeeded in separately synthesizing the pure levo form and showed that it was less toxic and more potent than the other form.

It was first approved for marketing in Japan in 1993, for oral administration, and Daiichi marketed it there under the brand name Cravit. Daiichi, working with Johnson & Johnson as it had with ofloxacin, obtained FDA approval in 1996 under the brand name Levaquin to treat bacterial sinusitus, bacterial exacerbations of bronchitis, community-acquired pneumonia, uncomplicated skin infections, complicated urinary tract infections, and acute pyelonephritis.

== Society and culture ==
=== Economics ===
Levofloxacin had reached blockbuster status by this time; combined worldwide sales of levofloxacin and ofloxacin for J&J alone were US$1.6 billion in 2009.

The term of the levofloxacin United States patent was extended by the U.S. Patent and Trademark Office 810 days under the provisions of the Hatch Waxman Amendment so that the patent would expire in 2010 instead of 2008. This extension was challenged by generic drug manufacturer Lupin Pharmaceuticals, which did not challenge the validity of the patent, but only the validity of the patent extension, arguing that the patent did not cover a "product" and so Hatch-Waxman was not available for extensions. The federal patent court ruled in favor of J&J and Daiichi, and generic versions of levofloxacin did not enter the U.S. market until 2009.

=== Availability ===
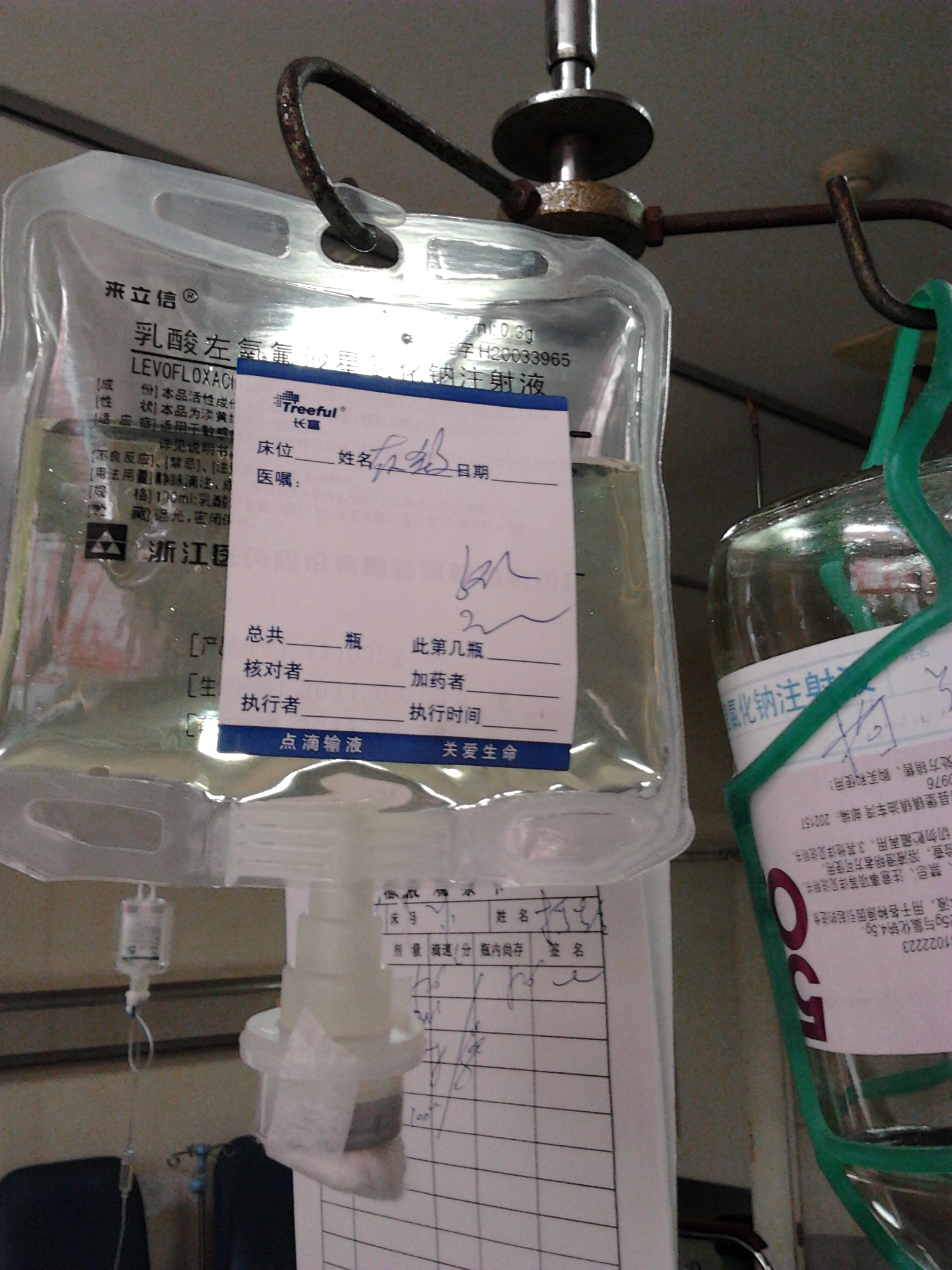
Levofloxacin and NaCl injection, specification is 100mL / 750mg

Levofloxacin is available in tablet form, injection, patches, and oral solution.

=== Usage ===
The US Food and Drug Administration estimated that in 2011, over 23 million outpatient prescriptions for fluoroquinolones, of which levofloxacin made up 28%, were filled in the United States.

=== Litigation ===
As of 2012, Johnson and Johnson was facing around 3400 state and federal lawsuits filed by people who claimed tendon damage from levofloxacin; about 1900 pending in a class action at the United States District Court in Minnesota and about 1500 pending at a district court in New Jersey.

In October 2012, J&J settled 845 cases in the Minnesota action, after Johnson and Johnson prevailed in three of the first four cases to go to trial. By May 2014, all but 363 cases had been settled or adjudicated.

=== Brand names ===
Levofloxacin is marketed by Sanofi-Aventis under a license agreement signed with Daiichi in 1993, under the brand name Tavanic.
