= Dexketoprofen =

Chemical compound

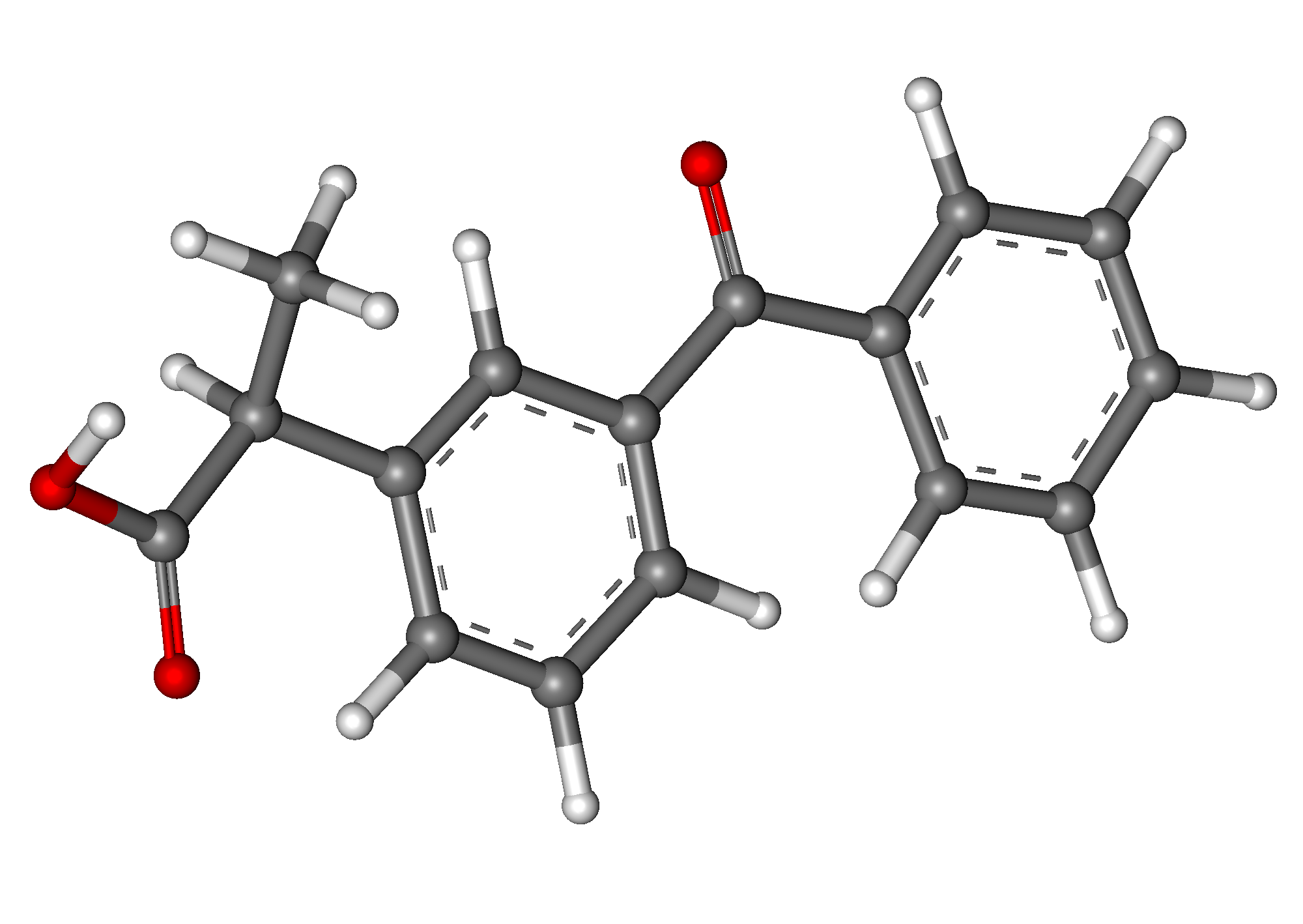

Clinical data
- AHFS/Drugs.com: International Drug Names
- ATC code: M01AE17 (WHO) M02AA27 (WHO)

Legal status
- Legal status: UK: POM (Prescription only)

Identifiers
- IUPAC name: (2S)-2-[3-(benzoyl)phenyl]propanoic acid
- CAS Number: 22161-81-5
- PubChem CID: 667550
- DrugBank: DB09214
- ChemSpider: 580922
- UNII: 6KD9E78X68
- KEGG: D07269
- ChEBI: CHEBI:76128
- ChEMBL: ChEMBL75435
- CompTox Dashboard (EPA): DTXSID40905141
- ECHA InfoCard: 100.118.639

Chemical and physical data
- Formula: C_{16}H_{14}O_{3}
- Molar mass: 254.285 g·mol^{−1}
- 3D model (JSmol): Interactive image
- SMILES: C[C@@H](c1cccc(c1)C(=O)c2ccccc2)C(=O)O
- InChI: InChI=1S/C16H14O3/c1-11(16(18)19)13-8-5-9-14(10-13)15(17)12-6-3-2-4-7-12/h2-11H,1H3,(H,18,19)/t11-/m0/s1; Key:DKYWVDODHFEZIM-NSHDSACASA-N

Dexketoprofen is a nonsteroidal anti-inflammatory drug (NSAID). It is manufactured by Menarini, under the tradename Keral. It is available in the UK, as dexketoprofen trometamol, as a prescription-only drug and in Latin America as Enantyum, produced by Menarini. Also, in Italy and Spain it is available as an over-the-counter drug (OTC) under the trade name Enandol or Enantyum. In Hungary it is available from a pharmacy as Ketodex. In Turkey, it is an over the counter medicine under the name Arveles. In Latvia, Lithuania and Estonia it is available as an OTC under the tradename Dolmen. In Mexico it is available in tablet form as Stadium made by Menarini. It is the dextrorotatory stereoisomer of ketoprofen.

== Chemistry ==
Dexketoprofen is the (S)-enantiomer of ketoprofen. Technically it is a chiral switch of (±)-ketoprofen. The switch was done for a faster onset of action and a better therapeutic value. Dexketoprofen consists of a propionic acid moiety connected to a benzophenone molecule by its second carbon.

== Medical uses ==
Short-term treatment of mild to moderate pain, including dysmenorrhoea. It is also used for migraines and knee pain.

== Side effects ==
It may cause dizziness, and patients should not, therefore, drive or operate heavy machinery or vehicles until they are familiar with how dexketoprofen affects them. Concomitant use of alcohol and other sedatives may potentiate this effect. In a small subset of individuals the dizziness may be intolerable and require transition to an alternative treatment.

== Pharmacology ==
Dexketoprofen belongs to a class of medicines called NSAIDs. It works by blocking the action of the enzyme cyclo-oxygenase, which is involved in the production of pro-inflammatory prostaglandins. Prostaglandins are produced in response to injury or certain diseases and would otherwise go on to cause swelling, inflammation and pain. By blocking cyclo-oxygenase, dexketoprofen prevents the production of prostaglandins and therefore reduces inflammation and pain. Along with peripheral analgesic action, it possesses central analgesic action.

== See also ==
- Chiral switch
- Enantiopure drug
- Chirality
