= Ketoprofen =

NSAID analgesic medication

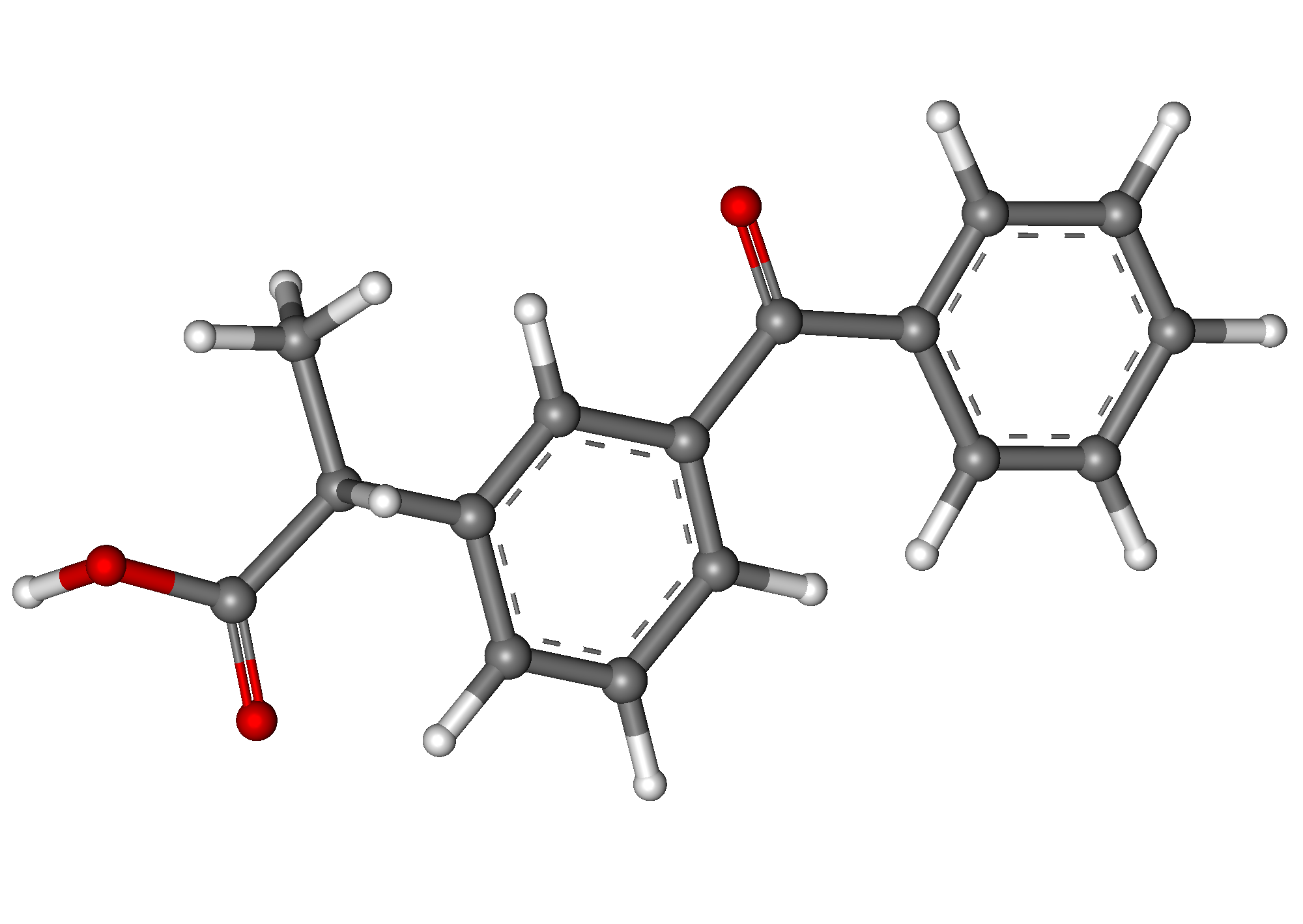

Clinical data
- Trade names: Oruvail, others
- AHFS/Drugs.com: Monograph
- MedlinePlus: a686014
- License data: US DailyMed: Ketoprofen
- Pregnancy category: AU: C
- Routes of administration: By mouth, topical, intravenous
- ATC code: M01AE03 (WHO) M01AE53 (WHO), M02AA10 (WHO)

Legal status
- Legal status: AU: S3 (Pharmacist only) / S4; CA: ℞-only; US: ℞-only; Rx-only & OTC

Pharmacokinetic data
- Protein binding: 99%
- Elimination half-life: 2–2.5 hours

Identifiers
- IUPAC name: (RS)-2-(3-benzoylphenyl)propanoic acid
- CAS Number: 22071-15-4
- PubChem CID: 3825
- IUPHAR/BPS: 4795
- DrugBank: DB01009
- ChemSpider: 3693
- UNII: 90Y4QC304K
- KEGG: D00132
- ChEBI: CHEBI:6128
- ChEMBL: ChEMBL571
- CompTox Dashboard (EPA): DTXSID6020771
- ECHA InfoCard: 100.040.676

Chemical and physical data
- Formula: C_{16}H_{14}O_{3}
- Molar mass: 254.285 g·mol^{−1}
- 3D model (JSmol): Interactive image
- Chirality: Racemic mixture
- SMILES: CC(c1cccc(c1)C(=O)c2ccccc2)C(=O)O
- InChI: InChI=1S/C16H14O3/c1-11(16(18)19)13-8-5-9-14(10-13)15(17)12-6-3-2-4-7-12/h2-11H,1H3,(H,18,19); Key:DKYWVDODHFEZIM-UHFFFAOYSA-N

Ketoprofen is one of the propionic acid class of nonsteroidal anti-inflammatory drugs (NSAID) with analgesic and antipyretic effects. It acts by inhibiting the body's production of prostaglandin.

It was patented in 1967 and approved for medical use in 1980.

== Medical uses ==
Ketoprofen is generally prescribed for arthritis-related inflammatory pains or severe toothaches that result in the inflammation of the gums.

Ketoprofen topical patches are being used for treatment of musculoskeletal pain.

Ketoprofen can also be used for treatment of some pain, especially nerve pain such as sciatica, postherpetic neuralgia and referred pain for radiculopathy, in the form of a cream, ointment, liquid, spray, or gel, which may also contain ketamine and lidocaine, along with other agents which may be useful, such as cyclobenzaprine, amitriptyline, acyclovir, gabapentin, orphenadrine and other drugs used as NSAIDs or adjuvant, atypical or potentiators for pain treatment.

=== Efficacy ===
A 2013 systematic review indicated "The efficacy of orally administered ketoprofen in relieving moderate-severe pain and improving functional status and general condition was significantly better than that of ibuprofen and/or diclofenac." A 2017 Cochrane systematic review investigating ketoprofen as a single-dose by mouth in acute, moderate-to-severe postoperative pain concluded that its efficacy is equivalent to drugs such as ibuprofen and diclofenac.

There is evidence supporting topical ketoprofen for osteoarthritis but not other chronic musculoskeletal pain.

== Adverse effects ==
In October 2020, the U.S. Food and Drug Administration (FDA) required the prescribing information to be updated for all nonsteroidal anti-inflammatory medications to describe the risk of kidney problems in fetuses that result in low amniotic fluid. They recommend avoiding NSAIDs in pregnant women at 20 weeks or later in pregnancy.

== Mechanism ==
Ketoprofen undergoes metabolism in the liver via conjugation with glucuronic acid (glucuronidation) by UGT enzymes, hydroxylation of the benzoyl ring by the CYP3A4 and CYP2C9 enzymes, and reduction of its ketone moiety (a carbonyl functional group, i.e. with carbon-oxygen double bond) by carbonyl reducing enzymes (CREs). Ketoprofen is used for its antipyretic, analgesic, and anti-inflammatory properties by inhibiting cyclooxygenase-1 and -2 (COX-1 and COX-2) enzymes reversibly, which decreases production of proinflammatory prostaglandin precursors.

The patches have been shown to provide rapid and sustained delivery to underlying tissues without significantly increasing levels of drug concentration in the blood when compared to the traditional oral administration.

=== Chirality and biological activity ===
Ketoprofen has one stereogenic center in the side chain and hence exists as mirror-image twins. Majority of the profens are marketed as racemic mixtures. For most of the NSAIDs the pharmacological activity resides in the (S)-enantiomers with their (R)-enantiomer virtually inactive. An interesting observation about most profens including ketoprofen is that they undergo unidirectional metabolic inversion, chiral inversion, of the (R)- acid to its (S)-mirror-image version with no other change in the molecule. There have been concerns raised that Ketoprofen can break down into the parent benzophenone molecule in skin exposed to strong summer or tropical UV light and this could pose a theoretical cancer risk. Given such a risk it is better to use other pain killers in such circumstances.

== History ==
The earliest report of therapeutic use in humans is in 1972.

== Society and culture ==
=== Brand names ===
Brand names in Albania are Oki and Fastum Gel. The names in Australia include Orudis and Oruvail. It is available in Estonia as Keto, Ketonal, and Fastum Gel; in Finland as Ketorin, Keto, Ketomex, and Orudis; in France as Profénid, Bi-Profénid, Toprec, and Ketum. It can be bought in Indonesia as Kaltrofen; in Ireland as Fastum Gel. In Italy it is sold as Ketodol, Fastum Gel, Lasonil, Orudis, Oki and Okitask; in Greece as Okitask. It is available in Japan in a transdermal patch, Mohrus Tape, made by Hisamitsu Pharmaceutical. In Mexico it is sold as Arthril; in Norway as Zon and Orudis. In Poland as Ketonal, Ketonal active, and Ketolek. In Romania as Ketonal and Fastum Gel; in Russia as ОКИ (OKI), Fastum Gel and Ketonal. In Serbia, Slovenia and Croatia as Knavon and Ketonal. In Spain as Actron and Fastum Gel. It is available in the UK as Ketoflam and Oruvail. Lastly, it is sold in Venezuela as Ketoprofeno as an injectable solution of 100 mg and 150 mg capsules.

In some countries, the optically pure (S)-enantiomer (dexketoprofen) is available; its trometamol salt is said to be particularly rapidly reabsorbed from the gastrointestinal tract, having a rapid onset of effects.

== Veterinary medicine ==
Ketoprofen is a common NSAID, antipyretic, and analgesic used in horses and other equines. It is most commonly used for musculoskeletal pain, joint problems, and soft tissue injury, as well as laminitis. It is also used to control fevers and prevent endotoxemia. It is also used as a mild painkiller in smaller animals, generally following surgical procedures.

In horses, it is given at a dose of 2.2 mg/kg/day. Studies have shown that it does not inhibit 5-lipoxygenase and leukotriene B4, as originally claimed. It is therefore not considered superior to phenylbutazone as previously believed, although clinical signs of lameness are reduced with its use. In fact, phenylbutazone was shown superior to ketoprofen in cases of experimentally-induced synovitis when both drugs were used at labeled dosages.

=== Ecological problems ===
Experiments have found ketoprofen, like diclofenac, is a veterinary drug causing lethal effects in red-headed vultures. Vultures feeding on the carcasses of recently treated livestock develop acute kidney failure within days of exposure.
