= Eudysmic ratio =

Ratio of activity of drug enantiomers

The eudysmic ratio (also spelled eudismic ratio) represents the difference in pharmacologic activity between the two enantiomers of a drug. In most cases where a chiral compound is biologically active, one enantiomer is more active than the other. The eudysmic ratio (ER) is the ratio of activity between the two. A eudysmic ratio significantly differing from 1 means that they are statistically different in activity. The ER reflects the degree of enantioselectivity of the biological systems. For example, (S)-propranolol has ER = 130, meaning that (S)-propranolol is 130 times more active than its (R)-enantiomer.

== Terminology ==
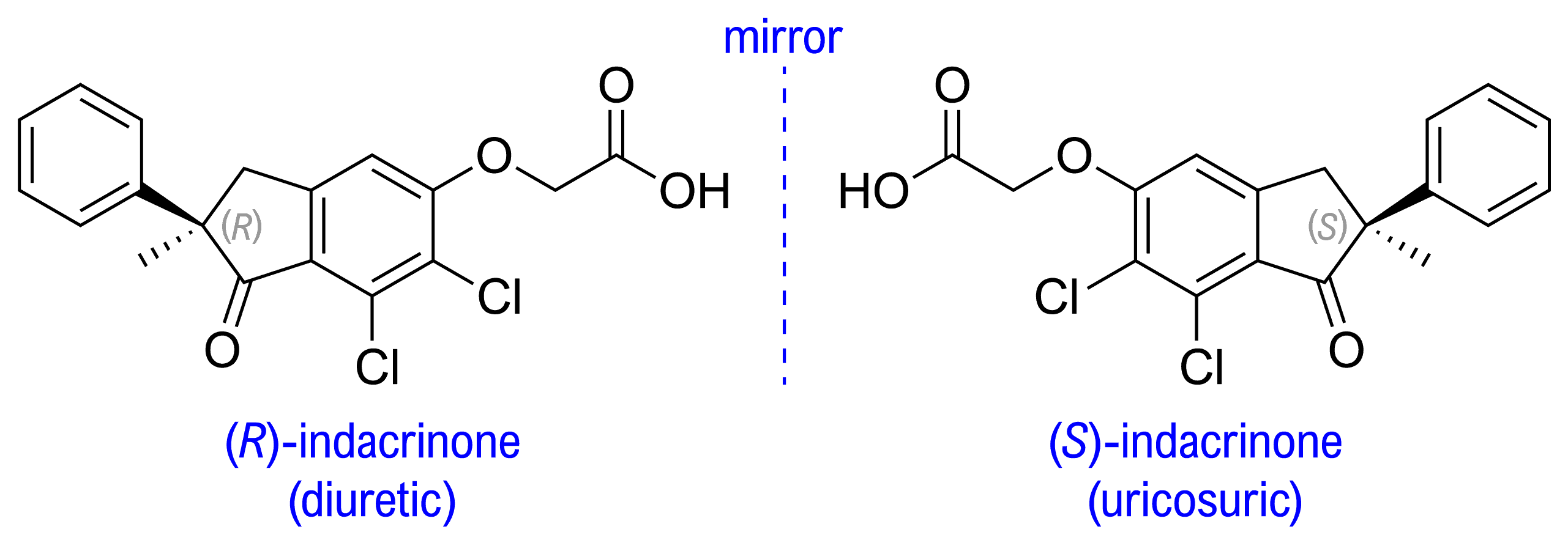
Indacrinone enantiomers

The eutomer is the enantiomer having the desired pharmacological activity, e.g., as an active ingredient in a drug.

The distomer (also spelled dystomer), on the other hand, is the enantiomer of the eutomer whose bioactivity may be undesired or absent.

A racemic mixture is an equal mixture of both enantiomers, which may be easier to manufacture than a single enantiomeric form.

It is often the case that only a single one of the enantiomers contains all of the wanted bioactivity, the distomer is often less active, has no desired activity or may even be toxic. In some cases, the eudysmic ratio is so high, that it is desired to separate the two enantiomers instead of leaving it as a racemic product. It is also possible that the distomer is not simply completely inactive but actually antagonizes the effects of the eutomer. There are a few examples of chiral drugs where both the enantiomers contribute, in different ways, to the overall desired effect. An interesting situation is that in which the distomer antagonizes a side-effect of the eutomer for the desired action, mutually beneficial action form therapeutic standpoint. This is convincingly demonstrated by the diuretic indacrinone.

The (R)-(+)-isomer, the eutomer, is responsible for the diuretic action and undesired uric acid retention, a side-effect common to many diuretics. The (S)-(-)-isomer, the distomer, acts as a uricosuric agent and thus antagonizes the side-effect caused by the (R)-isomer. A superficial examination of these facts might suggest the marketing of this product as a racemate (1:1 mixture of both enantiomers) to be desirable, since both enantiomers are complementing each other, but for optimal action, the ideal eutomer to distomer ratio for indacrinone has been determined to be 9:1. This is a classical case of a non-racemic drug. Alternatively, it is possible that in the body the distomer converts, at least in part, into the eutomer.

== Calculation ==
One way the eudysmic ratio is computed is by dividing the EC_{50} or the IC_{50} of the eutomer by the same measurement of the distomer. Whether one chooses to use the EC_{50} or IC_{50} depends on the drug in question.

== Examples ==
- The more potent enantiomer of the antidepressant citalopram was isolated and marketed as the drug escitalopram.
- Thalidomide is a drug whose two enantiomers cause distinctly different effects from one another. The unforeseen teratogenicity of the (R)-(+)-isomer caused it to become an important case study of stereochemistry in medicine. Although it is possible to chemically isolate just the desired (S)-(-)-isomer from the racemic mixture, the two enantiomers rapidly interconvert in vivo; thus rendering their separation to be of little use.
- Methorphan is another drug whose two enantiomers possess very different binding profiles, with the L-enantiomer being a potent opioid analgesic, and the D-enantiomer being a commonly used over-the-counter cough suppressant which acts as an NMDA-antagonist but possesses nearly no opioid activity. In the case of morphinan, the eudysmic ratio is preserved after metabolism as the D and L metabolites possess the same pharmacological targets as the corresponding methorphan enantiomers, but are considerably more potent than their parent compounds.
- Amino acids are also an example of eudysmic ratio. Nearly all of the amino acids in the human body are L-amino acids; despite being chiral, the body almost exclusively creates and uses amino acids in this one configuration. D-amino acids, the enantiomers — or "mirror images" — of the amino acids in the human body cannot be incorporated into proteins. D-aspartate and D-serine are two notable counterexamples, since they do not appear to ever be incorporated into proteins, but instead act individually as signalling molecules. However, mammals can metabolize significant amount of D-amino acids by oxidizing them to alpha-ketoacids (most of which are non-chiral) and then transaminases can create L-amino acids. There are no reasons to believe that humans are exceptional, they have all required enzymes (DDO, DAO). Some common foods contain near-racemic mixtures of amino acids.

== See also ==
- Chiral switch
- Enantiopure drug
