= Levosalbutamol =

Chemical compound

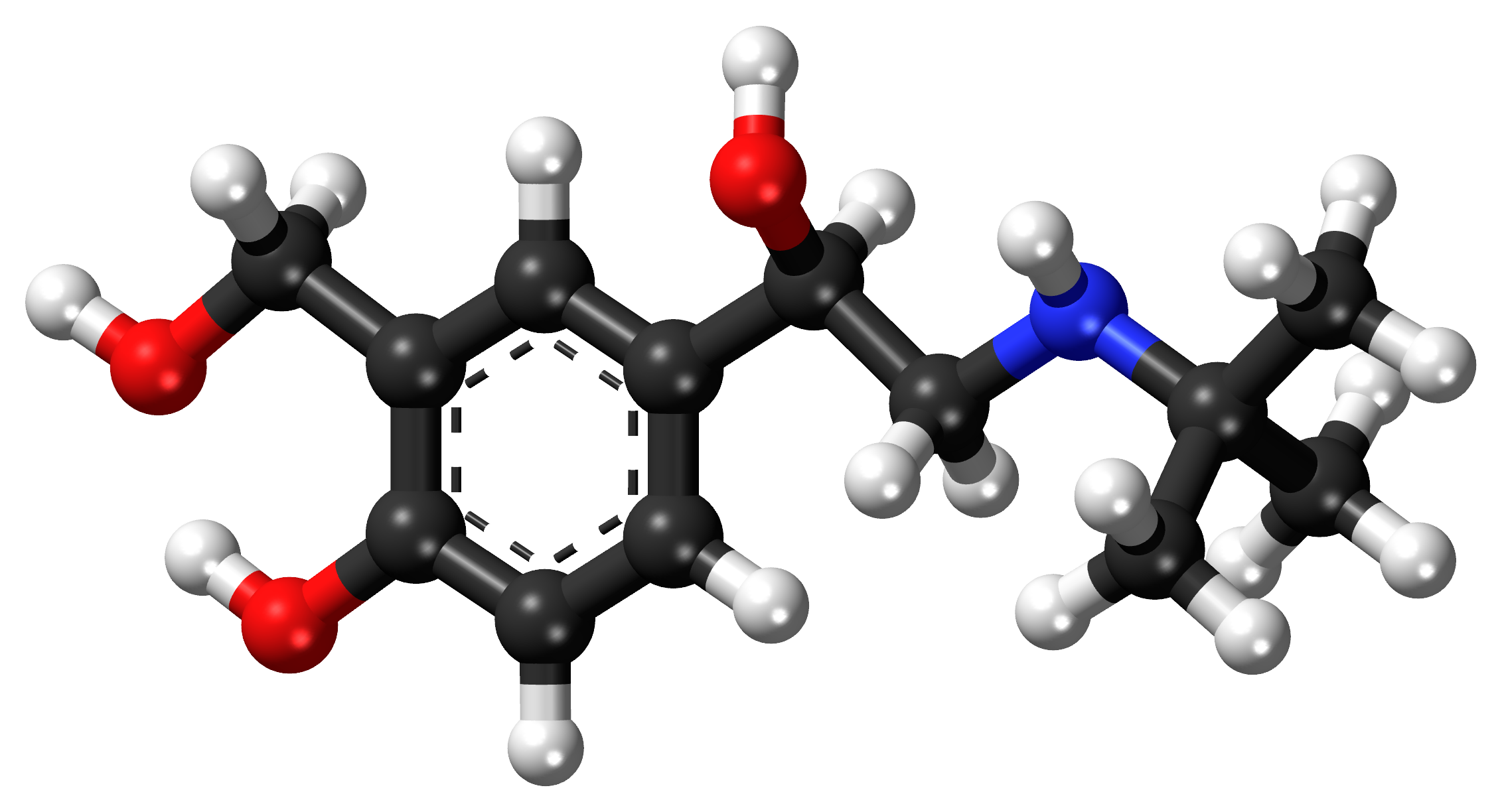

Clinical data
- Trade names: Xopenex, others
- Other names: Evalbuterol, levalbuterol (USAN US)
- AHFS/Drugs.com: Micromedex Detailed Consumer Information
- MedlinePlus: a603025
- License data: US DailyMed: Levalbuterol
- Pregnancy category: AU: A
- Routes of administration: By mouth, inhalation
- ATC code: None

Legal status
- Legal status: US: ℞-only

Pharmacokinetic data
- Metabolism: Liver
- Elimination half-life: 3.3–4 hours
- Excretion: Urinary

Identifiers
- IUPAC name: 4-[(1R)-2-(tert-butylamino)-1-hydroxyethyl]- 2-(hydroxymethyl)phenol
- CAS Number: 34391-04-3
- PubChem CID: 123600
- DrugBank: DB01001
- ChemSpider: 110192
- UNII: EDN2NBH5SS
- KEGG: D08124
- ChEBI: CHEBI:8746
- ChEMBL: ChEMBL1002
- CompTox Dashboard (EPA): DTXSID80187964
- ECHA InfoCard: 100.113.688

Chemical and physical data
- Formula: C_{13}H_{21}NO_{3}
- Molar mass: 239.315 g·mol^{−1}
- 3D model (JSmol): Interactive image
- SMILES: OCc1cc(ccc1O)[C@@H](O)CNC(C)(C)C
- InChI: InChI=1S/C13H21NO3/c1-13(2,3)14-7-12(17)9-4-5-11(16)10(6-9)8-15/h4-6,12,14-17H,7-8H2,1-3H3/t12-/m0/s1; Key:NDAUXUAQIAJITI-LBPRGKRZSA-N

Levosalbutamol, also known as levalbuterol, is a β_{2}-adrenergic receptor agonist used in the treatment of bronchospasm. Levosalbutamol is the (R)-(−)-enantiomer of its prototype drug salbutamol.

== Medical use ==
Levosalbutamol is indicated for the treatment or prevention of bronchospasm in people aged four years of age and older with reversible obstructive airway disease.

=== Comparison to salbutamol ===
Evidence is inconclusive regarding the efficacy of levosalbutamol versus salbutamol (albuterol) or salbutamol-levosalbutamol combinations, though levosalbutamol is believed to have a better safety profile due to its more selective binding to β_{2} receptors (primarily in the lungs) versus β_{1} (primarily in heart muscle).

A 2013 systematic review of the use of levalbuterol as a treatment for acute asthma found that it "was not superior to albuterol regarding efficacy and safety in subjects with acute asthma." The review concluded: "We suggest that levalbuterol should not be used over albuterol for acute asthma."

== Adverse effects ==
Generally, levosalbutamol is well tolerated. Common mild side effects include an elevated heart rate, muscle cramps, and gastric upset (including heartburn and diarrhea).

Symptoms of overdose in particular include: collapse into a seizure; chest pain (possible precursor of a heart attack); fast, pounding heartbeat, which may cause raised blood pressure (hypertension); irregular heartbeat (cardiac arrhythmia), which may cause paradoxical lowered blood pressure (hypotension); nervousness and tremor; headache; dizziness and nausea/vomiting; weakness or exhaustion (medical fatigue); dry mouth; and insomnia.

Rarer side effects may indicate a dangerous allergic reaction. These include: paradoxical bronchospasm (shortness of breath and difficulty breathing); skin itching, rash, or hives (urticaria); swelling (angioedema) of any part of the face or throat (which can lead to voice hoarseness), or swelling of the extremities.

== Pharmacology ==
=== Mechanism of action ===
Activation of β_{2} adrenergic receptors on airway smooth muscle leads to the activation of adenylate cyclase and to an increase in the intracellular concentration of 3',5'-cyclic adenosine monophosphate (cyclic AMP). The increase in cyclic AMP is associated with the activation of protein kinase A, which in turn, inhibits the phosphorylation of myosin and lowers intracellular ionic calcium concentrations, resulting in muscle relaxation.

Levosalbutamol relaxes the smooth muscles of all airways, from the trachea to the terminal bronchioles. Increased cyclic AMP concentrations are also associated with the inhibition of the release of mediators from mast cells in the airways. Levosalbutamol acts as a functional agonist that relaxes the airway irrespective of the spasmogen involved, thereby protecting against all bronchoconstrictor challenges.

While it is recognized that β_{2} adrenergic receptors are the predominant receptors on bronchial smooth muscle, data indicate that there are beta receptors in the human heart, 10–50% of which are β_{2} adrenergic receptors. The precise function of these receptors has not been established. However, all β-adrenergic agonist drugs can produce a significant cardiovascular effect in some patients, as measured by pulse rate, blood pressure, and restlessness symptoms, and/or electrocardiographic (ECG).

Levosalbutamol and salbutamol do not racemize significantly before being eliminated from the human body. Enantiomerically pure levosalbutamol is preferred over racemic salbutamol in most cases, because the other optical isomer (S-salbutamol) has some negative side-effects.

== Society and culture ==
Levosalbutamol is on the list of drugs banned by the World Anti-Doping Agency.

=== Economics ===
Levalbuterol is more costly than salbutamol.

=== Legal status ===
Levalbuterol was approved in the United States as a solution to be used with a nebulizer device in March 1999, and in March 2005, became available in a formulation with a metered-dose inhaler under the brand name Xopenex HFA (levalbuterol tartrate inhalation aerosol).

=== Names ===
Levosalbutamol is the international nonproprietary name and levalbuterol is the United States Adopted Name. It is available in Bangladesh as Purisal by Incepta Pharmaceuticals Ltd.
