= Topicity =

In stereochemistry, topicity is the stereochemical relationship between substituents and the structure to which they are attached. Depending on the relationship, such groups can be heterotopic, homotopic, enantiotopic, or diastereotopic.

== Homotopic ==
Homotopic groups in a chemical compound are equivalent groups. Two groups A and B are homotopic if the molecule remains achiral when the groups are interchanged with some other atom (such as bromine) while the remaining parts of the molecule stay fixed. Homotopic atoms are always identical, in any environment. Homotopic NMR-active nuclei have the same chemical shift in an NMR spectrum. For example, the four hydrogen atoms of methane (CH_{4}) are homotopic with one another, as are the two hydrogens or the two chlorines in dichloromethane (CH_{2}Cl_{2}).

== Enantiotopic ==
The stereochemical term enantiotopic refers to the relationship between two groups in a molecule which, if one or the other were replaced, would generate a chiral compound. The two possible compounds resulting from that replacement would be enantiomers.

For example, the two hydrogen atoms attached to the second carbon in butane are enantiotopic. Replacement of one hydrogen atom (colored blue) with a bromine atom will produce (R)-2-bromobutane. Replacement of the other hydrogen atom (colored red) with a bromine atom will produce the enantiomer (S)-2-bromobutane.

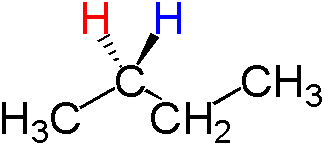
Butane

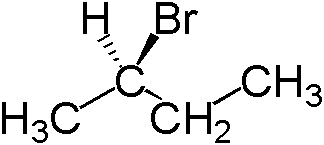
(R)-2-bromobutane

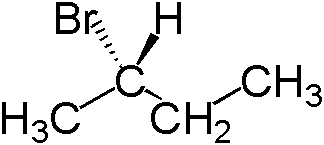
(S)-2-bromobutane

Enantiotopic groups are identical and indistinguishable except in chiral environments. For instance, the CH_{2} hydrogens in ethanol (CH_{3}CH_{2}OH) are normally enantiotopic, but can be made different (diastereotopic) if combined with a chiral center, for instance by conversion to an ester of a chiral carboxylic acid such as lactic acid, or if coordinated to a chiral metal center, or if associated with an enzyme active site, since enzymes are constituted of chiral amino acids. Indeed, in the presence of the enzyme LADH, one specific hydrogen is removed from the CH_{2} group during the oxidation of ethanol to acetaldehyde, and it gets replaced in the same place during the reverse reaction. The chiral environment needs not be optically pure for this effect.

Enantiotopic groups are mirror images of each other about an internal plane of symmetry. A chiral environment removes that symmetry. Enantiotopic pairs of NMR-active nuclei are also indistinguishable by NMR and produce a single signal.

Enantiotopic groups need not be attached to the same atom. For example, two hydrogen atoms adjacent to the carbonyl group in cis-2,6-dimethylcyclohexanone are enantiotopic; they are related by an internal plane of symmetry passing through the carbonyl group, but deprotonation on one side of the carbonyl group or on the other will generate compounds that are enantiomers. Similarly, the replacement of one or the other with deuterium will generate enantiomers.

== Diastereotopic ==
The stereochemical term diastereotopic refers to the relationship between two groups in a molecule which, if replaced, would generate compounds that are diastereomers. Diastereotopic groups are often, but not always, identical groups attached to the same atom in a molecule containing at least one chiral center.

For example, the two hydrogen atoms of the CH_{2} moiety in (S)-2-bromobutane are diastereotopic. Replacement of one hydrogen atom (colored blue) with a bromine atom will produce (2S,3R)-2,3-dibromobutane. Replacement of the other hydrogen atom (colored red) with a bromine atom will produce the diastereomer (2S,3S)-2,3-dibromobutane.

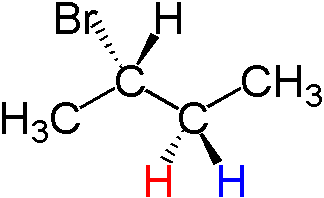
(S)-2-bromobutane

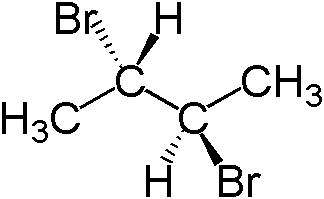
(2S,3R)-2,3-dibromobutane

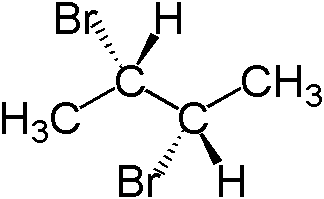
(2S,3S)-2,3-dibromobutane

In chiral molecules containing diastereotopic groups, such as in 2-bromobutane, there is no requirement for enantiomeric or optical purity; no matter its proportion, each enantiomer will generate enantiomeric sets of diastereomers upon substitution of diastereotopic groups (though, as in the case of substitution by bromine in 2-bromobutane, meso isomers have, strictly speaking, no enantiomer).

Diastereotopic groups are not mirror images of one another about any plane. They are always different, in any environment, but may not be distinguishable. For instance, both pairs of CH_{2} hydrogens in ethyl phenylalaninate hydrochloride (PhCH_{2}CH(NH_{3}^{+})COOCH_{2}CH_{3} Cl^{−}) are diastereotopic and both give pairs of distinct ^{1}H-NMR signals in DMSO-d_{6} at 300 MHz, but in the similar ethyl 2-nitrobutanoate (CH_{3}CH_{2}CH(NO_{2})COOCH_{2}CH_{3}), only the CH_{2} group next to the chiral center gives distinct signals from its two hydrogens with the same instrument in CDCl_{3}. Such signals are often complex because of small differences in chemical shift, overlap and an additional strong coupling between geminal hydrogens. On the other hand, the two CH_{3} groups of ipsenol, which are three bonds away from the chiral center, give separate ^{1}H doublets at 300 MHz and separate ^{13}C-NMR signals in CDCl_{3}, but the diastereotopic hydrogens in ethyl alaninate hydrochloride (CH_{3}CH(NH_{3}^{+})COOCH_{2}CH_{3} Cl^{−}), also three bonds away from the chiral center, show barely distinguishable ^{1}H-NMR signals in DMSO-d_{6}.

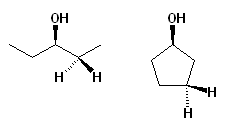
Figure 1. Diastereotopic hydrogens in achiral compounds.

Diastereotopic groups also arise in achiral molecules. For instance, any one pair of CH_{2} hydrogens in 3-pentanol (Figure 1) are diastereotopic, as the two CH_{2} carbons are enantiotopic. Substitution of any one of the four CH_{2} hydrogens creates two chiral centers at once, and the two possible hydrogen substitution products at any one CH_{2} carbon will be diastereomers. This kind of relationship is often easier to detect in cyclic molecules. For instance, any pair of CH_{2} hydrogens in cyclopentanol (Figure 2) are similarly diastereotopic, and this is easily discerned as one of the hydrogens in the pair will be cis to the OH group (on the same side of the ring face) while the other will be trans to it (on the opposite side).

The term diastereotopic is also applied to identical groups attached to the same end of an alkene moiety which, if replaced, would generate geometric isomers (also falling in the category of diastereomers). Thus, the CH_{2} hydrogens of propene are diastereotopic, one being cis to the CH_{3} group, and the other being trans to it, and replacement of one or the other with CH_{3} would generate cis- or trans--2-butene.

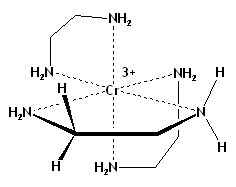
Figure 2. Diastereotopic hydrogens in a chiral metal complex.

Diastereotopicity is not limited to organic molecules, nor to groups attached to carbon, nor to molecules with chiral tetrahedral (sp^{3}-hybridized) centers: for instance, the pair of hydrogens in any CH_{2} or NH_{2} group in tris(ethylenediamine)chromium(III) ion (Cr(en)_{3}^{3+}), where the metal center is chiral, are diastereotopic (Figure 2).

The terms enantiotopic and diastereotopic can also be applied to the faces of planar groups (especially carbonyl groups and alkene moieties). See Cahn-Ingold-Prelog priority rule.

== Heterotopic ==
Heterotopic groups are those that when substituted are structurally different. They are neither diastereotopic or enantiotopic nor homotopic.

== See also ==
- Prochiral
- conformational analysis
