= Molecular configuration =

Permanent geometry of a molecule

The molecular configuration of a molecule is the permanent geometry that results from the spatial arrangement of its bonds. The ability of the same set of atoms to form two or more molecules with different configurations is stereoisomerism. This is distinct from constitutional isomerism which arises from atoms being connected in a different order. Conformers which arise from single bond rotations, if not isolatable as atropisomers, do not count as distinct molecular configurations as the spatial connectivity of bonds is identical.

== Enantiomers ==
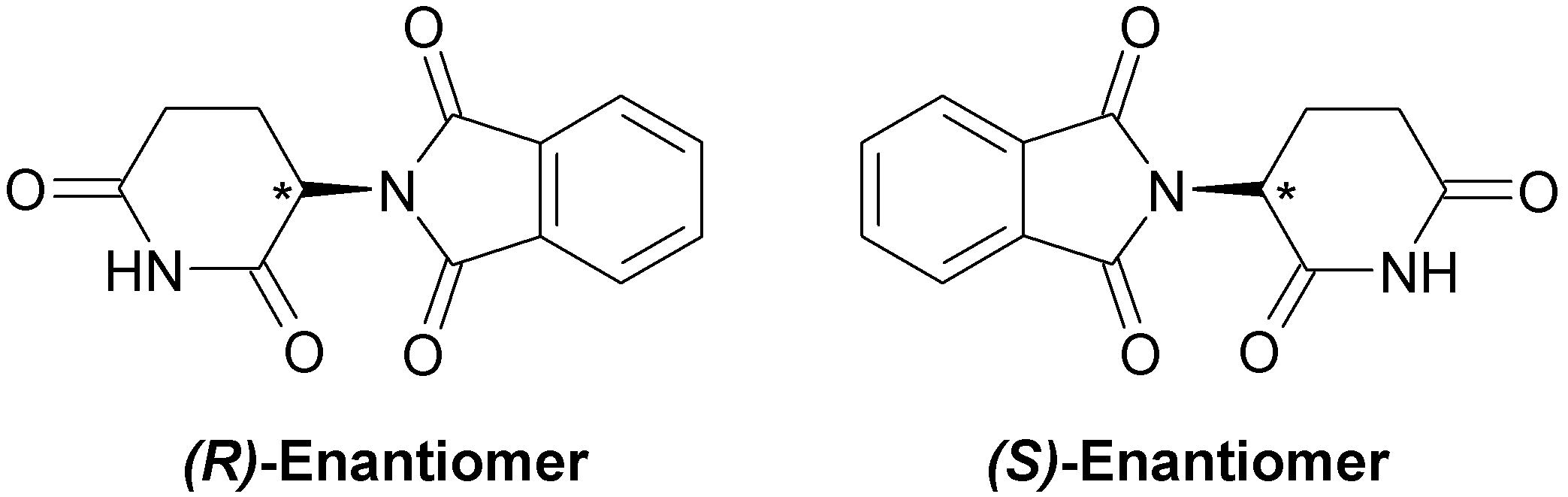
R-S isomerism of thalidomide. Chiral center marked with a star(*). Hydrogen (not drawn) is projecting behind the chiral centre.

Enantiomers are molecules having one or more chiral centres that are mirror images of each other. Chiral centres are designated R or S. If the 3 groups projecting towards you are arranged clockwise from highest priority to lowest priority, that centre is designated R. If counterclockwise, the centre is S. Priority is based on atomic number: atoms with higher atomic number are higher priority. If two molecules with one or more chiral centres differ in all of those centres, they are enantiomers.

== Diastereomers ==
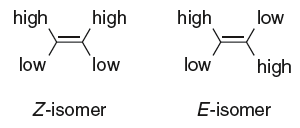
Assignment of E and Z isomerism based on group priority.

Diastereomers are distinct molecular configurations that are a broader category. They usually differ in physical characteristics as well as chemical properties. If two molecules with more than one chiral centre differ in one or more (but not all) centres, they are diastereomers. All stereoisomers that are not enantiomers are diastereomers. Diastereomerism also exists in alkenes. Alkenes are designated Z or E depending on group priority on adjacent carbon atoms. E/Z notation describes the absolute stereochemistry of the double bond. Cis/trans notation is also used to describe the relative orientations of groups.

== Configurations in amino acids ==
L vs D configuration of amino acids

Amino acids are designated either L or D depending on relative group arrangements around the stereogenic carbon center. L/D designations are not related to S/R absolute configurations. Only L configured amino acids are found in biological organisms. All amino acids except for L-cysteine have an S configuration and glycine is non-chiral.

In general, all L designated amino acids are enantiomers of their D counterparts except for isoleucine and threonine which contain two carbon stereocenters, making them diastereomers.

== Configurations of pharmacological compounds ==
Used as drugs, compounds with different configuration normally have different physiological activity, including the desired pharmacological effect, the toxicology and the metabolism. Enantiomeric ratios and purity is an important factor in clinical assessments. Racemic mixtures are those that contain equimolar amounts of both enantiomers of a compound. Racemate and single enantiomer actions differ in most cases.

== See also ==
- Absolute configuration
