= Pseudochirality =

Type of chirality

An example of psuedochirality (1R,2s,3S)-1,2,3-trichlorocyclopentane

Pseudochirality or pseudoasymmetry occurs when chirality is reliant only on other atoms in the molecule that are chiral. Most commonly, a stereocenter with 2 identical substituents differing only in having opposite chirality are bonded to the same stereocenter. For example, if substituents 1, 2, 3 and 4 are bonded to a single carbon and substituents 3 and 4 are the same only differing in that 3 is R and 4 is S, the molecule would be pseudochiral. This is because if substituents 3 and 4 have the same chirality, there would no longer be 4 different substituents bonded to the center atom which disestablishes the center atom as a stereocenter and renders the molecule unable to be chiral. When an atom is pseudochiral, its nomenclature is (r/s) instead of (R/S). An important note is that R takes priority over S in assigning CIP priority. In the pictured example the stereocenter C(s) is bonded to Cl, H, C(R) and C(S). Since the two carbons are opposite in terms of R/S, they count as two distinct and differing substituents this makes the stereocenter C(s) pseudochiral. Pseudochirality can affect the effectiveness of some drugs.

== Axial Pseudochirality ==
Pseudochirality can also exist in the form of axial chirality most commonly in atropisomers, allenes and alkylidene cycloalkanes.
