= Epimer =

One of a pair of diastereomers

In stereochemistry, an epimer is one of a pair of diastereomers. The two epimers have opposite configuration at only one stereogenic center out of at least two. All other stereogenic centers in the molecules are the same in each. Epimerization is the interconversion of one epimer to the other epimer.

== Examples ==
The stereoisomers β-D-glucopyranose and β-D-mannopyranose are epimers because they differ only in the stereochemistry at the C-2 position. The hydroxy group in β-D-glucopyranose is equatorial (in the "plane" of the ring), while in β-D-mannopyranose the C-2 hydroxy group is axial (up from the "plane" of the ring). These two molecules are epimers, but because they are not mirror images of each other, are not enantiomers. (Enantiomers have the same name, but differ in D and L classification.) They are also not sugar anomers, since it is not the anomeric carbon involved in the stereochemistry. Similarly, β-D-glucopyranose and β-D-galactopyranose are epimers that differ at the C-4 position, with the former being equatorial and the latter being axial.

β-D-glucopyranose	β-D-mannopyranose

In the case that the difference is the -OH groups on C-1, the anomeric carbon, such as in the case of α-D-glucopyranose and β-D-glucopyranose, the molecules are both epimers and anomers (as indicated by the α and β designation).

α-D-glucopyranose	β-D-glucopyranose

Other closely related compounds are epi-inositol and inositol, and lipoxin and epilipoxin.

epi-inositol	Inositol	Lipoxin	Epilipoxin

Doxorubicin and epirubicin are two epimers that are used as drugs.

Doxorubicin–epirubicin comparison

== Epimerization ==
Epimerization is a chemical process where an epimer is converted to its diastereomeric counterpart. It can happen in condensed tannins depolymerization reactions. Epimerization can be spontaneous (generally a slow process), or catalysed by enzymes, e.g. the epimerization between the sugars N-acetylglucosamine and N-acetylmannosamine, which is catalysed by renin-binding protein.

The penultimate step in Zhang & Trudell's classic epibatidine synthesis is an example of epimerization. Pharmaceutical examples include epimerization of the erythro isomers of methylphenidate to the pharmacologically preferred and lower-energy threo isomers, and undesired in vivo epimerization of tesofensine to brasofensine.
