= Stereospecificity =

Ability of a chemical reaction mechanism to differentiate between stereoisomers

In chemistry, stereospecificity is the property of a reaction mechanism that leads to different stereoisomeric reaction products from different stereoisomeric reactants, or which operates on only one (or a subset) of the stereoisomers.

In contrast, stereoselectivity is the property of a reactant mixture where a non-stereospecific mechanism allows for the formation of multiple products, but where one (or a subset) of the products is favored by factors, such as steric access, that are independent of the mechanism.

A stereospecific mechanism specifies the stereochemical outcome of a given reactant, whereas a stereoselective reaction selects products from those made available by the same, non-specific mechanism acting on a given reactant. Given a single, stereoisomerically pure starting material, a stereospecific mechanism will give 100% of a particular stereoisomer (or no reaction), although loss of stereochemical integrity can easily occur through competing mechanisms with different stereochemical outcomes. A stereoselective process will normally give multiple products even if only one mechanism is operating on an isomerically pure starting material.

The term stereospecific reaction is ambiguous, since the term reaction itself can mean a single-mechanism transformation (such as the Diels–Alder reaction), which could be stereospecific, or the outcome of a reactant mixture that may proceed through multiple competing mechanisms, specific and non-specific. In the latter sense, the term stereospecific reaction is commonly misused to mean highly stereoselective reaction.

Chiral synthesis is built on a combination of stereospecific transformations (for the interconversion of existing stereocenters) and stereoselective ones (for the creation of new stereocenters), where also the optical activity of a chemical compound is preserved.

The quality of stereospecificity is focused on the reactants and their stereochemistry; it is concerned with the products too, but only as they provide evidence of a difference in behavior between reactants. Of stereoisomeric reactants, each behaves in its own specific way. Stereospecificity towards enantiomers is called enantiospecificity.

== Examples ==
Nucleophilic substitution at sp^{3} centres can proceed by the stereospecific S_{N}2 mechanism, causing only inversion, or by the non-specific S_{N}1 mechanism, the outcome of which can show a modest selectivity for inversion, depending on the reactants and the reaction conditions to which the mechanism does not refer. The choice of mechanism adopted by a particular reactant combination depends on other factors (steric access to the reaction centre in the substrate, nucleophile, solvent, temperature).

Stereospecificity in substitution reactions
| SN1 reaction mechanism | SN2 reaction mechanism |
| S_{N}1 mechanism non-stereospecific | S_{N}2 mechanism stereospecific |

For example, tertiary centres react almost exclusively by the S_{N}1 mechanism whereas primary centres (except neopentyl centres) react almost exclusively by the S_{N}2 mechanism. When a nucleophilic substitution results in incomplete inversion, it is because of a competition between the two mechanisms, as often occurs at secondary centres, or because of double inversion (as when iodide is the nucleophile).

The addition of singlet carbenes to alkenes is stereospecific in that the geometry of the alkene is preserved in the product. For example, dibromocarbene and cis-2-butene yield cis-2,3-dimethyl-1,1-dibromocyclopropane, whereas the trans isomer exclusively yields the trans cyclopropane.

This addition remains stereospecific even if the starting alkene is not isomerically pure, as the products' stereochemistry will match the reactants'.

The disrotatory ring closing reaction of conjugated trienes is stereospecific in that isomeric reactants will give isomeric products. For example, trans,cis,trans-2,4,6-octatriene gives cis-dimethylcyclohexadiene, whereas the trans,cis,cis reactant isomer gives the trans product and the trans,trans,trans reactant isomer does not react in this manner.

== See also ==
- Dynamic stereochemistry
