= Diastereomer =

Molecules which are non-mirror image, non-identical stereoisomers

Diastereomers that are also epimers
D-threose	D-erythrose

In stereochemistry, diastereomers (sometimes called diastereoisomers) are a type of stereoisomer. Diastereomers are defined as non-mirror image, non-identical stereoisomers. Hence, they occur when two or more stereoisomers of a compound have different configurations at one or more (but not all) of the equivalent (related) stereocenters and are not mirror images of each other. When two diastereoisomers differ from each other at only one stereocenter, they are epimers. Each stereocenter gives rise to two different configurations and thus typically increases the number of stereoisomers by a factor of two.

Diastereomers differ from enantiomers in that the latter are pairs of stereoisomers that differ in all stereocenters and are therefore mirror images of one another. Enantiomers of a compound with more than one stereocenter are also diastereomers of the other stereoisomers of that compound that are not their mirror image (that is, excluding the opposing enantiomer). Diastereomers have different physical properties (unlike most aspects of enantiomers) and often different chemical reactivity.

Diastereomers differ not only in physical properties but also in chemical reactivity — how a compound reacts with others. Glucose and galactose, for instance, are diastereomers. Even though they share the same molar weight, glucose is more stable than galactose. This difference in stability causes galactose to be absorbed slightly faster than glucose in the human body.

Diastereoselectivity is the preference for the formation of one or more than one diastereomer over the other in an organic reaction. In general, stereoselectivity is attributed to torsional and steric interactions in the stereocenter resulting from electrophiles approaching the stereocenter in reaction.

== Syn / anti ==
When the single bond between the two centres is free to rotate, cis/trans descriptors become invalid. Two widely accepted prefixes used to distinguish diastereomers on sp³-hybridised bonds in an open-chain molecule are syn and anti. Masamune proposed the descriptors which work even if the groups are not attached to adjacent carbon atoms. It also works regardless of CIP priorities. Syn describes groups on the same face while anti describes groups on opposite faces. The concept applies only to the Zigzag projection. The descriptors only describe relative stereochemistry rather than absolute stereochemistry. All isomers are same.

== Erythro / threo ==
Two older prefixes still commonly used to distinguish diastereomers are threo and erythro.These are typically used when the diastereomer has an achiral carbon.In the case of saccharides, when drawn in the Fischer projection the erythro isomer has two identical substituents on the same side and the threo isomer has them on opposite sides. When drawn as a zig-zag chain, the erythro isomer has two identical substituents on different sides of the plane (anti). The names are derived from the diastereomeric four-carbon aldoses erythrose and threose. These prefixes are not recommended for general use because it is often difficult to discern how to apply their definitions to particular compounds. However, the prefixes can usefully describe the configuration of a compound that has the following properties: it has at least four C atoms, exactly two of those C atoms are stereocenters, the stereocenters are adjacent, and the two substituents on each stereocenter can clearly be labeled as "larger" (usually a heteroatom such as N, O, or S) and "smaller" (usually H).

Threitol and erythritol are both four-carbon sugar alcohols. Erythritol is achiral (has at least one conformation with a plane or center of symmetry), whereas threitol is chiral. A useful English-language mnemonic device is that "threitol" and "chiral" both begin with consonants, whereas "erythritol" and "achiral" both begin with vowels.

Another threo compound is threonine, one of the amino acids coded by DNA. Its erythro diastereomer, allothreonine, is not coded by DNA and is very rare in nature.

L-Threonine (2S,3R) and D-Threonine (2R,3S)

L-Allothreonine (2S,3S) and D-Allothreonine (2R,3R)

In alkene addition reactions, syn addition to a trans alkene, or anti addition to a cis alkene, gives a threo product, whereas syn addition to a cis alkene, or anti addition to a trans alkene, gives an erythro product.

== Multiple stereocenters ==
If a molecule contains two asymmetric centers, there are up to four possible configurations, and they cannot all be non-superposable mirror images of each other. The possibilities for different isomers continue to multiply as more stereocenters are added to a molecule. In general, the number of stereoisomers of a molecule can be determined by calculating 2^{n}, where n = the number of chiral centers in the molecule. This holds true except in cases where the molecule has meso forms. These meso compounds are molecules that contain stereocenters, but possess an internal plane of symmetry allowing it to be superposed on its mirror image. These equivalent configurations cannot be considered diastereomers.

For n = 3, there are eight stereoisomers. Among them, there are four pairs of enantiomers: R,R,R and S,S,S; R,R,S and S,S,R; R,S,S and S,R,R; and R,S,R and S,R,S. There are many more pairs of diastereomers, because each of these configurations is a diastereomer with respect to every other configuration excluding its own enantiomer (for example, R,R,R is a diastereomer of R,R,S; R,S,R; and R,S,S). For n = 4, there are sixteen stereoisomers, or eight pairs of enantiomers. The four enantiomeric pairs of aldopentoses and the eight enantiomeric pairs of aldohexoses (subsets of the five- and six-carbon sugars) are examples of sets of compounds that differ in this way.

== Diastereomerism at a double bond ==
Double bond isomers are always considered diastereomers, not enantiomers. Diastereomerism can also occur at a double bond, where the cis vs trans relative positions of substituents give two non-superposable isomers. Many conformational isomers are diastereomers as well.

In the case of diastereomerism occurring at a double bond, E-Z, or entgegen and zusammen (German), is used in notating nomenclature of alkenes.

== Applications ==
As stated previously, two diastereomers will not have identical chemical properties. This knowledge is harnessed in chiral synthesis to separate a mixture of enantiomers. This is the principle behind chiral resolution. After preparing the diastereomers, they are separated by chromatography or recrystallization. Note also the example of the stereochemistry of ketonization of enols and enolates.

== See also ==
- Cahn–Ingold–Prelog priority rules for nomenclature.
