= Stereocenter =

Atom which is the focus of stereoisomerism in a molecule

Two enantiomers of a generic amino acid at the stereocenter

In stereochemistry, a stereocenter of a molecule is an atom (center), axis or plane that is the focus of stereoisomerism; that is, when having at least three different groups bound to the stereocenter, interchanging any two different groups creates a new stereoisomer. Stereocenters are also referred to as stereogenic centers.

A stereocenter is geometrically defined as a point (location) in a molecule; a stereocenter is usually but not always a specific atom, often carbon. Stereocenters can exist on chiral or achiral molecules; stereocenters can contain single bonds or double bonds. The number of hypothetical stereoisomers can be predicted by using 2^{n}, with n being the number of tetrahedral stereocenters; however, exceptions such as meso compounds can reduce the prediction to below the expected 2^{n}.

Chirality centers are a type of stereocenter with four different substituent groups; chirality centers are a specific subset of stereocenters because they can only have sp^{3} hybridization, meaning that they can only have single bonds.

== Location ==
Stereocenters can exist on chiral or achiral molecules. They are defined as a location (point) within a molecule, rather than a particular atom, in which the interchanging of two groups creates a stereoisomer. A stereocenter can have either four different attachment groups, or three different attachment groups where one group is connected by a double bond. Since stereocenters can exist on achiral molecules, stereocenters can have either sp^{3} or sp^{2} hybridization.

== Possible number of stereoisomers ==
Stereoisomers are compounds that are identical in composition and connectivity but have a different spatial arrangement of atoms around the central atom. A molecule having multiple stereocenters will produce many possible stereoisomers. In compounds whose stereoisomerism is due to tetrahedral (sp^{3}) stereogenic centers, the total number of hypothetically possible stereoisomers will not exceed 2^{n}, where n is the number of tetrahedral stereocenters. However, this is an upper bound because molecules with symmetry frequently have fewer stereoisomers.

The stereoisomers produced by the presence of multiple stereocenters can be defined as enantiomers (non-superposable mirror images) and diastereomers (non-superposable, non-identical, non-mirror image molecules). Enantiomers and diastereomers are produced due to differing stereochemical configurations of molecules containing the same composition and connectivity (bonding). Enantiomers and diastereomers will produce individual stereoisomers that contribute to the total number of possible stereoisomers.

However, the stereoisomers produced may also give a meso compound, which is an achiral compound that is superposable on its mirror image; the presence of a meso compound will reduce the number of possible stereoisomers. Since a meso compound is superposable on its mirror image, the two "stereoisomers" are actually identical. Resultantly, a meso compound will reduce the number of stereoisomers to below the hypothetical 2^{n} amount due to symmetry.

Additionally, certain configurations may not exist due to steric reasons. Cyclic compounds with chiral centers may not exhibit chirality due to the presence of a two-fold rotation axis. Planar chirality may also provide for chirality without having an actual chiral center present.

== Configuration ==
Configuration is defined as the arrangement of atoms around a stereocenter. The Cahn-Ingold-Prelog (CIP) system uses R and S designations to define the configuration of atoms about any stereocenter. A designation of R denotes a clockwise direction of substituent priority around the stereocenter, while a designation of S denotes a counter-clockwise direction of substituent priority.

== Chirality centers ==
A chirality center (chiral center) is a type of stereocenter. A chirality center is defined as an atom holding a set of four different ligands (atoms or groups of atoms) in a spatial arrangement which is non-superposable on its mirror image. Chirality centers must be sp^{3} hybridized, meaning that a chirality center can only have single bonds. In organic chemistry, a chirality center usually refers to a carbon, phosphorus, or sulfur atom, though it is also possible for other atoms to be chirality centers, especially in areas of organometallic and inorganic chemistry.

The concept of a chirality center generalizes the concept of an asymmetric carbon atom (a carbon atom bonded to four different entities) to a broader definition of any atom with four different attachment groups in which an interchanging of any two attachment groups gives rise to an enantiomer.

== Stereogenic on carbon ==
A carbon atom that is attached to four different substituent groups is called an asymmetric carbon atom or chiral carbon. Chiral carbons are the most common type of chirality center.

== Stereogenic on other atoms ==
Chirality is not limited to carbon atoms, though carbon atoms are often centers of chirality due to their ubiquity in organic chemistry. Nitrogen and phosphorus atoms can also form bonds in a tetrahedral configuration. A nitrogen in an amine may be a stereocenter if all three groups attached are different because the electron pair of the amine functions as a fourth group. However, nitrogen inversion, a form of pyramidal inversion, causes racemization which means that both epimers at that nitrogen are present under normal circumstances. Racemization by nitrogen inversion may be restricted (such as quaternary ammonium or phosphonium cations), or slow, which allows the existence of chirality.

Metal atoms with tetrahedral or octahedral geometries may also be chiral due to having different ligands. For the octahedral case, several chiralities are possible. Having three ligands of two types, the ligands may be lined up along the meridian, giving the mer-isomer, or forming a face—the fac isomer. Having three bidentate ligands of only one type gives a propeller-type structure, with two different enantiomers denoted Λ and Δ.

== Chirality and stereocenters ==
As mentioned earlier, the requirement for an atom to be a chirality center is that the atom must be sp^{3} hybridized with four different attachments. Because of this, all chirality centers are stereocenters. However, only under some conditions is the reverse true. Recall that a point can be considered a sterocenter with a minimum of three attachment points; stereocenters can be either sp^{3} or sp^{2} hybridized, as long as the interchanging any two different groups creates a new stereoisomer. This means that although all chirality centers are stereocenters, not every stereocenter is a chirality center.

Stereocenters are important identifiers for chiral or achiral molecules. As a general rule, if a molecule has no stereocenters, it is considered achiral. If it has at least one stereocenter, the molecule has the potential for chirality. However, there are some exceptions like meso compounds that make molecules with multiple stereocenters considered achiral.

== See also ==
- Chirality (chemistry) § Stereogenic centers
- Cahn–Ingold–Prelog priority rules for nomenclature
- Descriptor (chemistry)
- Pseudochirality
