= Methylcyclopentadiene =

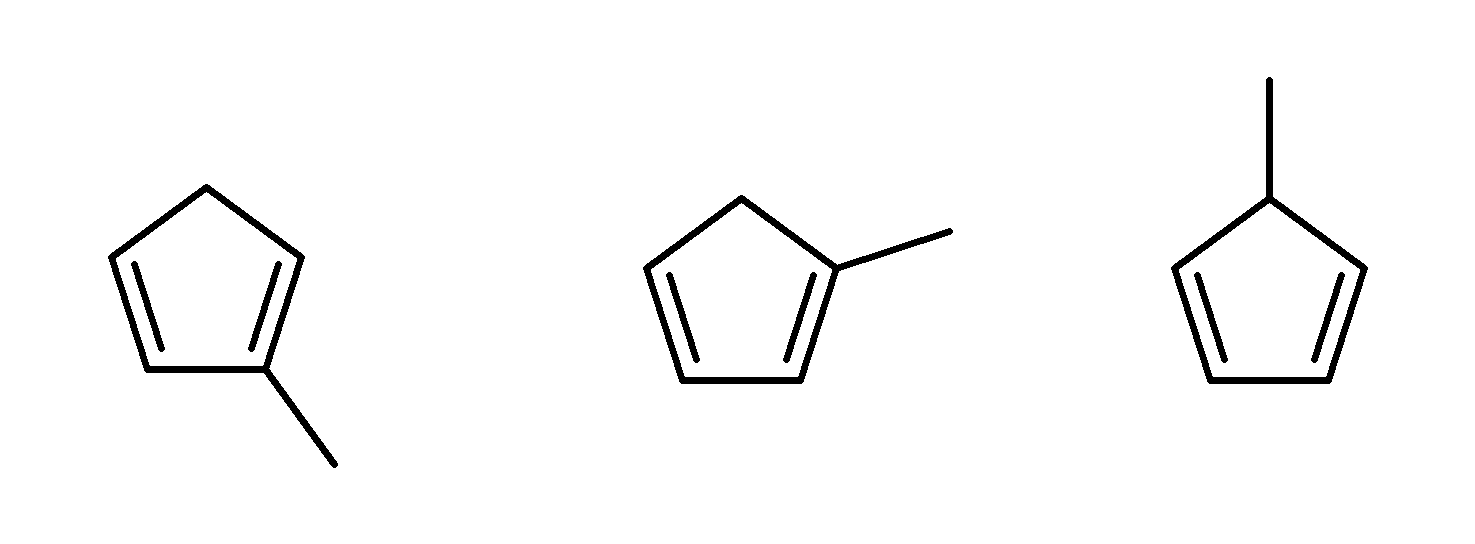
- Left to right: 2-methyl-1,3-cyclopentadiene; 1-methyl-1,3-cyclopentadiene; 5-methyl-1,3-cyclopentadiene

Names
- Other names Cp′; MeCp

Identifiers
CAS Number	unspec: 96-38-8; 1-methyl: 96-39-9; 2-methyl: 3727-31-9; 5-methyl: 26519-91-5
3D model (JSmol)	1-methyl: Interactive image; 2-methyl: Interactive image; 5-methyl: Interactive image
ChemSpider	1-methyl: 60141; 2-methyl: 121669; 5-methyl: 23802
ECHA InfoCard	100.043.400
EC Number	1-methyl: 247-724-5
PubChem CID	1-methyl: 66775; 2-methyl: 138026; 5-methyl: 25512
UNII	1-methyl: K4O53GR393; 5-methyl: X1DWO24VEA
UN number	1993
CompTox Dashboard (EPA)	1-methyl: DTXSID0067216; 2-methyl: DTXSID10190729; 5-methyl: DTXSID7048035
- InChI: 1-methyl: InChI=1S/C6H8/c1-6-4-2-3-5-6/h2-4H,5H2,1H3 Key: NFWSQSCIDYBUOU-UHFFFAOYSA-N; 2-methyl: InChI=1S/C6H8/c1-6-4-2-3-5-6/h2,4-5H,3H2,1H3 Key: AHQZRFBZJSCKAV-UHFFFAOYSA-N; 5-methyl: InChI=1S/C6H8/c1-6-4-2-3-5-6/h2-6H,1H3 Key: QVRBGKYLLCLCHL-UHFFFAOYSA-N
- SMILES: 1-methyl: C\1=C\C=C(\C)C/1; 2-methyl: C\1=C\C(\C)=CC/1; 5-methyl: C\1=C\C=CC/1(\C)

Properties
Chemical formula	C_{6}H_{8}
Molar mass	80.130 g·mol^{−1}

Hazards
- GHS labelling
Pictograms	(GHS02: Flammable) (GHS08: Health hazard) (GHS09: Environmental hazard)
Signal word	Danger
Hazard statements	H226, H350, H410
Precautionary statements	P201, P202, P210, P233, P240, P241, P242, P243, P273, P280, P281, P303+P361+P353, P308+P313, P370+P378, P391, P403+P235, P405, P501
- Except where otherwise noted, data are given for materials in their standard state (at 25 °C [77 °F], 100 kPa). verify (what is ?) Infobox references

Methylcyclopentadiene is any of three isomeric cyclic dialkenes with the formula C_{5}MeH_{5} (Me = CH_{3}). These isomers are the organic precursor to the methylcyclopentadienyl ligand (C_{5}H_{4}Me, often denoted as Cp′), commonly found in organometallic chemistry.

As with cyclopentadiene, methylcyclopentadiene is prepared by thermal cracking of its Diels–Alder dimer, followed by distillation for removal of cyclopentadiene, a common impurity.

== Methylcyclopentadienyl anion ==
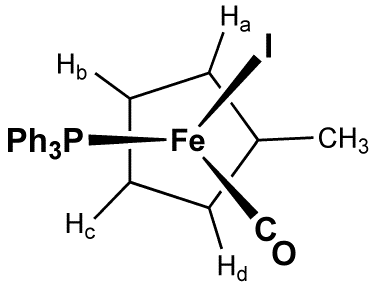
Structure of Cp′Fe(PPh_{3})(CO)I, with labels for the four diastereotopic ring protons.

Deprotonation of methylcyclopentadiene gives the aromatic methylcyclopentadienyl anion. This ion is useful as a ligand for organometallic complexes. Relative to the corresponding cyclopentadienyl (Cp) complexes, complexes of Cp′ exhibit enhanced solubility in organic solvents.

Cp′ can be used to probe the structure of organometallic complexes. For example, Cp′Fe(PPh_{3})(CO)I has four different signals in the ^{1}H NMR spectrum for the ring hydrogens and five different signals in the ^{13}C NMR spectrum for the ring carbons. There is therefore no symmetry within the ring even accounting for rotation around the ring–metal axis, but instead there is a diastereotopic relationship as a result of being part of a chiral complex. The achiral precursor complex Cp′Fe(CO)_{2}I has only two signals for those hydrogens and three for those carbons, indicating a symmetric structure.

== See also ==
- Pentamethylcyclopentadiene
