= Enantiomer self-disproportionation =

Non-linear phenomenon in chemistry causing enantio-enrichment in achiral environnements

Enantiomer self-disproportionation is a process in stereochemistry describing the separation of a non-racemic mixture of enantiomers in an enantioenriched fraction and a more racemic fraction as a result of the formation of heterochiral or homochiral aggregates. This process is known to occur in achiral column chromatography.

The phenomenon was first reported in 1983 in the separation of an excess of carbon-14 labeled (S)-(−)-nicotine enantiomer and its isomer. Two fractions were recorded, one containing racemic nicotine and the other pure (S) enantiomer.

In 2006, Vadim A. Soloshonok introduced the term Enantiomer self-disproportionation or self-disproportionation of enantiomers. He investigated achiral separations of several trifluoromethyl compounds.

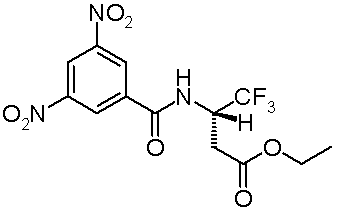
Enantiomer self-disproportionation (S)-trifluoromethyl substrate

By column chromatography on regular silica gel with a hexane / ethyl acetate eluent (5:1), a 66.6% ee sample of a trifluoromethyl substrate is separated into several fractions ranging from 8.1% ee for the first fraction collected to > 99.9% ee for the last fraction collected. A presence of a strong electronegative group in the substrate such as the trifluoromethyl group is a prerequisite. The effect disappears when a more polar eluent is selected. A possible explanation is offered. Compounds with large electronegative groups such as trifluoromethyl can form supramolecular associations or aggregates or clusters in which these groups are separated from each other as much as possible with minimized electrostatic repulsions. When these associations are stacks of alternating (R) and (S) molecules (as in syndiotactic polymers) this can be accomplished very efficiently. This association will form a racemic fraction of relatively high molecular weight eluting more slowly than the non-associating enantiopure fraction.

== See also ==
- disproportionation
