= E–Z notation =

Notation in organic chemistry for double bonds

E–Z configuration, or the E–Z convention, is the IUPAC's preferred method of describing the absolute stereochemistry of double bonds in organic chemistry. It is an extension of cis–trans isomer notation (which only describes relative stereochemistry) that can be used to describe double bonds having two, three or four substituents. E–Z notation can only be used when neither atom of the double bond has two identical atoms or substituent groups attached to it.

Following the Cahn–Ingold–Prelog priority rules (CIP rules), each substituent on a double bond is assigned a priority, then positions of the higher of the two substituents on each carbon are compared to each other. If the two groups of higher priority are on opposite sides of the double bond (trans to each other), the bond is assigned the configuration E (from entgegen, German: [ɛntˈɡeːɡən], the German word for "opposite"). If the two groups of higher priority are on the same side of the double bond (cis to each other), the bond is assigned the configuration Z (from zusammen, German: [tsuˈzamən], the German word for "together").

(E)-But-2-ene	(Z)-But-2-ene

The letters E and Z are conventionally printed in italic type, within parentheses, and separated from the rest of the name with a hyphen. They are always printed as full capitals (not in lowercase or small capitals), but do not constitute the first letter of the name for English capitalization rules (as in the example above).

Another example: The CIP rules assign a higher priority to bromine than to chlorine, and a higher priority to chlorine than to hydrogen, hence the following (possibly counterintuitive) nomenclature.

(E)-1-Bromo-1,2-dichloroethene	(Z)-1-Bromo-1,2-dichloroethene

Alitretinoin

For molecules with multiple double bonds, locants can be included to specify the geometry of each E and Z geometric detail. For example, the chemical name of alitretinoin is (2E,4E,6Z,8E)-3,7-dimethyl-9-(2,6,6-trimethyl-1-cyclohexenyl)nona-2,4,6,8-tetraenoic acid, indicating that the alkenes starting at positions 2, 4, and 8 are E while the one starting at position 6 is Z.

== Undefined ene stereochemistry ==
The prefix 'E/Z-' can be used to indicate uncertainty in the E or Z isomers for an ene bond. For graphical representations, wavy single bonds are the standard way to represent unknown or unspecified stereochemistry or a mixture of isomers (as with tetrahedral stereocenters). A crossed double-bond has been used sometimes; it is no longer considered an acceptable style for general use by IUPAC but may still be required by computer software.

Alkene stereochemistry

== See also ==
- Descriptor (chemistry)
- Geometric isomerism
- Molecular geometry
