= Geminal =

Molecular-structure relationship

In chemistry, the descriptor geminal (from Latin gemini 'twins') refers to the relationship between two atoms or functional groups that are attached to the same atom. A geminal diol, for example, is a diol (a molecule that has two alcohol functional groups) attached to the same carbon atom, as in methanediol. Also the shortened prefix gem may be applied to a chemical name to denote this relationship, as in a gem-dibromide for "geminal dibromide".

The concept is important in many branches of chemistry, including synthesis and spectroscopy, because functional groups attached to the same atom often behave differently from when they are separated. Geminal diols, for example, are easily converted to ketones or aldehydes with loss of water.

Comparison of geminal with vicinal and isolated substitution patterns.
	Alkane	geminal	vicinal	isolated
Methane			not existing	not existing
Ethane				not existing
Propane				
Substituents on selected dibromoalkanes labeled red.

The related term vicinal refers to the relationship between two functional groups that are attached to adjacent atoms. This relative arrangement of two functional groups can also be described by the descriptors α and β.

== ^{1}H NMR spectroscopy ==
In ^{1}H NMR spectroscopy, the coupling of two hydrogen atoms on the same carbon atom is called a geminal coupling. It occurs only when two hydrogen atoms on a methylene group differ stereochemically from each other. The geminal coupling constant is referred to as ^{2}J since the hydrogen atoms couple through two bonds. Depending on the other substituents, the geminal coupling constant takes values between −23 and +42 Hz.

== Synthesis ==
The following example shows the conversion of a cyclohexyl methyl ketone to a gem-dichloride through a reaction with phosphorus pentachloride. This gem-dichloride can then be used to synthesize an alkyne.

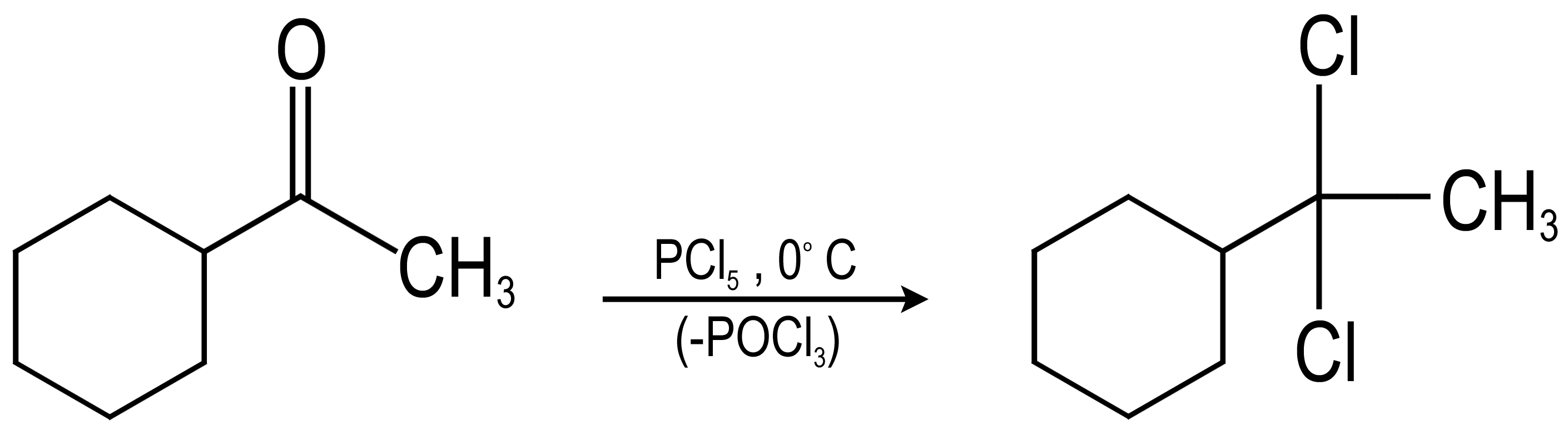
Cyclohexyl methyl ketone to gem-dichloride
