= Stereoisomerism =

When molecules have the same atoms and bond structure but differ in 3D orientation

Two kinds of stereoisomers

In stereochemistry, stereoisomerism, or spatial isomerism, is a form of isomerism in which molecules have the same molecular formula and sequence of bonded atoms (constitution), but differ in the three-dimensional orientations of their atoms in space. This contrasts with structural isomers, which share the same molecular formula, but the bond connections or their order differs. By definition, molecules that are stereoisomers of each other represent the same structural isomer.

== Enantiomers ==
Enantiomers, also known as optical isomers, are two stereoisomers that are related to each other by a reflection: they are mirror images of each other that are non-superposable. Human hands are a macroscopic analog of this. Every stereogenic center in one has the opposite configuration in the other. Two compounds that are enantiomers of each other have the same physical properties, except for the direction in which they rotate polarized light and how they interact with different enantiomers of other compounds. As a result, different enantiomers of a compound may have substantially different biological effects. Pure enantiomers also exhibit the phenomenon of optical activity and can be separated only with the use of a chiral agent. In nature, only one enantiomer of most chiral biological compounds, such as amino acids (except glycine, which is achiral), is present. Enantiomers differ by the direction they rotate polarized light: the amount of a chiral compound's optical rotation in the (+) direction is equal to the amount of its enantiomer's rotation in the (−) direction.

== Diastereomers ==
Diastereomers are stereoisomers not related through a reflection operation. They are not mirror images of each other. These include meso compounds, cis–trans isomers, E–Z isomers, and non-enantiomeric optical isomers. Unlike a pair of enantiomers, sets of diastereomers seldom have the same physical properties. In the example shown below, the meso form of tartaric acid forms a diastereomeric pair with both levo- and dextro-tartaric acids, which form an enantiomeric pair.

(natural) tartaric acid
L-tartaric acid
L-(+)-tartaric acid
levo-tartaric acid

D-tartaric acid
D-(-)-tartaric acid
dextro-tartaric acid

meso-tartaric acid

(1:1)
DL-tartaric acid
"racemic acid"

Note that the D- and L- labeling of the isomers above is not the same as the d- and l- labeling more commonly seen, explaining why these may appear reversed to those familiar with only the latter naming convention.

A Fischer projection can be used to differentiate between L- and D-molecules (see chirality). For instance, by definition, in a Fischer projection the penultimate carbon of D-sugars are depicted with hydrogen on the left and hydroxyl on the right. L-sugars will be shown with the hydrogen on the right and the hydroxyl on the left.

The other refers to optical rotation, when looking at the source of light, the rotation of the plane of polarization may be either to the right (dextrorotary — d-rotary, represented by (+), clockwise), or to the left (levorotary – l-rotary, represented by (−), counter-clockwise) depending on which stereoisomer is dominant. For instance, sucrose and camphor are d-rotary whereas cholesterol is l-rotary.

== Cis–trans and E–Z isomerism ==
Stereoisomerism about double bonds arises because rotation about the double bond is restricted, keeping the substituents fixed relative to each other. If the two substituents on at least one end of a double bond are the same, then there is no stereoisomer and the double bond is not a stereocenter, e.g. propene, CH_{3}CH=CH_{2} where the two substituents at one end are both H.

Traditionally, double bond stereochemistry was described as either cis (Latin, on this side) or trans (Latin, across), in reference to the relative position of substituents on either side of a double bond. A simple example of cis–trans isomerism is the 1,2-disubstituted ethenes, like the dichloroethene (C_{2}H_{2}Cl_{2}) isomers shown below.

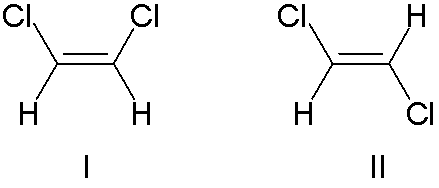
Dichloroethene isomers

Molecule I is cis-1,2-dichloroethene and molecule II is trans-1,2-dichloroethene. Due to occasional ambiguity, IUPAC adopted a more rigorous system wherein the substituents at each end of the double bond are assigned priority based on their atomic number. If the high-priority substituents are on the same side of the bond, it is assigned Z (Ger. zusammen, together). If they are on opposite sides, it is E (Ger. entgegen, opposite). Since chlorine has a larger atomic number than hydrogen, it is the highest-priority group. Using this notation to name the above pictured molecules, molecule I is (Z)-1,2-dichloroethene and molecule II is (E)-1,2-dichloroethene. It is not the case that Z and cis, or E and trans, are always interchangeable. Consider the following fluoromethylpentene:

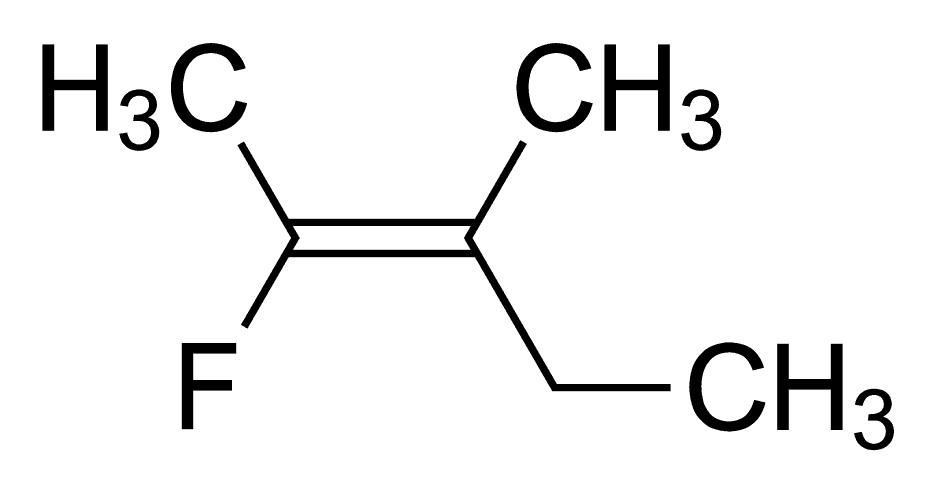
Fluoromethylpentene

The proper name for this molecule is either trans-2-fluoro-3-methylpent-2-ene because the alkyl groups that form the backbone chain (i.e., methyl and ethyl) reside across the double bond from each other, or (Z)-2-fluoro-3-methylpent-2-ene because the highest-priority groups on each side of the double bond are on the same side of the double bond. Fluoro is the highest-priority group on the left side of the double bond, and ethyl is the highest-priority group on the right side of the molecule.

The terms cis and trans are also used to describe the relative position of two substituents on a ring; cis if on the same side, otherwise trans.

== Conformers ==
Conformational isomerism is a form of isomerism that describes the phenomenon of molecules with the same structural formula but with different shapes due to rotations about one or more bonds. Different conformations can have different energies, can usually interconvert, and are very rarely isolatable. For example, there exists a variety of Cyclohexane conformations (which cyclohexane is an essential intermediate for the synthesis of nylon–6,6) including a chair conformation where four of the carbon atoms form the "seat" of the chair, one carbon atom is the "back" of the chair, and one carbon atom is the "foot rest"; and a boat conformation, the boat conformation represents the energy maximum on a conformational itinerary between the two equivalent chair forms; however, it does not represent the transition state for this process, because there are lower-energy pathways. The conformational inversion of substituted cyclohexanes is a very rapid process at room temperature, with a half-life of 0.00001 seconds.

There are some molecules that can be isolated in several conformations, due to the large energy barriers between different conformations. 2,2',6,6'-Tetrasubstituted biphenyls can fit into this latter category.

== Anomers ==
Anomerism is an identity for single bonded ring structures where "cis" or "Z" and "trans" or "E" (geometric isomerism) needs to name the substitutions on a carbon atom that also displays the identity of chirality; so anomers have carbon atoms that have geometric isomerism and optical isomerism (enantiomerism) on one or more of the carbons of the ring. Anomers are named "alpha" or "axial" and "beta" or "equatorial" when substituting a cyclic ring structure that has single bonds between the carbon atoms of the ring for example, a hydroxyl group, a methyl hydroxyl group, a methoxy group or another pyranose or furanose group which are typical single bond substitutions but not limited to these. Axial geometric isomerism will be perpendicular (90 degrees) to a reference plane and equatorial will be 120 degrees away from the axial bond or deviate 30 degrees from the reference plane.

== Atropisomers ==
Atropisomers are stereoisomers resulting from hindered rotation about single bonds where the steric strain barrier to rotation is high enough to allow for the isolation of the conformers.

== More definitions ==
- A configurational stereoisomer is a stereoisomer of a reference molecule that has the opposite configuration at a stereocenter (e.g., R- vs S- or E- vs Z-). This means that configurational isomers can be interconverted only by breaking covalent bonds to the stereocenter, for example, by inverting the configurations of some or all of the stereocenters in a compound.
- An epimer is a diastereoisomer that has the opposite configuration at only one of the stereocenters.

== Le Bel-van't Hoff rule ==
Le Bel-van't Hoff rule states that for a structure with n asymmetric carbon atoms, there is a maximum of 2^{n} different stereoisomers possible. As an example, D-glucose is an aldohexose and has the formula C_{6}H_{12}O_{6}. Four of its six carbon atoms are stereogenic, which means D-glucose is one of 2^{4}=16 possible stereoisomers.

== See also ==
- Descriptor (chemistry)
- Backbone-dependent rotamer library
