= RENBP =

Mammalian protein found in Homo sapiens

Identifiers
- Aliases: RENBP, RBP, RNBP, renin binding protein
- External IDs: OMIM: 312420; MGI: 105940; HomoloGene: 2184; GeneCards: RENBP; OMA:RENBP - orthologs

Gene location (Human)
Chr.	X chromosome (human)
Band	Xq28	Start	153,935,269 bp
Band	Xq28	End	153,944,687 bp

Gene location (Mouse)
Chr.	X chromosome (mouse)
Band	X A7.3|X 37.49 cM	Start	72,965,727 bp
Band	X A7.3|X 37.49 cM	End	72,974,456 bp
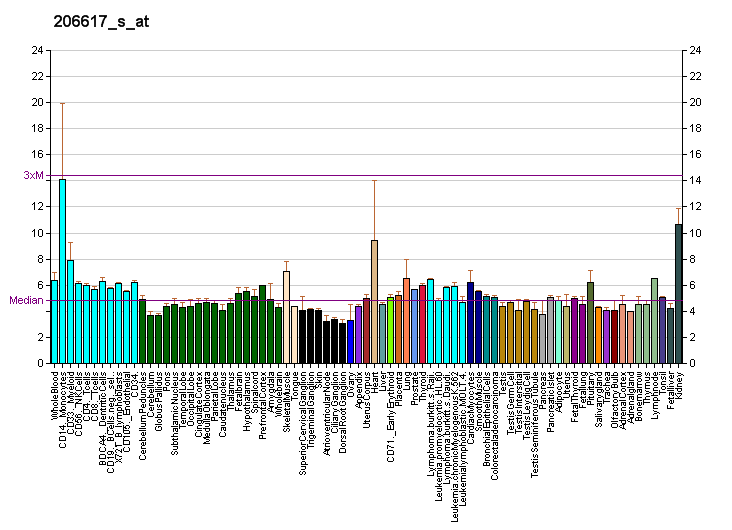
RNA expression pattern
Bgee	Human / Mouse (ortholog); Top expressed in: monocyte; spleen; granulocyte; right adrenal cortex; upper lobe of left lung; right lung; C1 segment; tibial nerve; left adrenal cortex; right coronary artery / Top expressed in: morula; yolk sac; right kidney; blastocyst; gastrula; human kidney; stroma of bone marrow; calvaria; proximal tubule; iris; More reference expression data
BioGPS	More reference expression data
Gene ontology
Molecular function	enzyme inhibitor activity; endopeptidase inhibitor activity; catalytic activity; isomerase activity; ATP binding; protein homodimerization activity; purine nucleotide binding; N-acylglucosamine 2-epimerase activity; peptidase inhibitor activity
Cellular component	extracellular exosome; cytosol
Biological process	N-acetylmannosamine metabolic process; regulation of blood pressure; N-acetylneuraminate catabolic process; negative regulation of catalytic activity; negative regulation of endopeptidase activity; N-acetylglucosamine metabolic process; UDP-N-acetylglucosamine biosynthetic process
Sources:Amigo / QuickGO
Orthologs
Species	Human	Mouse
Entrez	5973	19703
Ensembl	ENSG00000102032	ENSMUSG00000031387
UniProt	P51606	P82343
RefSeq (mRNA)	NM_002910	NM_001164704; NM_023132
RefSeq (protein)	NP_002901	NP_001158176; NP_075621
Location (UCSC)	Chr X: 153.94 – 153.94 Mb	Chr X: 72.97 – 72.97 Mb
PubMed search
- Wikidata
View/Edit Human	View/Edit Mouse

N-acylglucosamine 2-epimerase is an enzyme that in humans is encoded by the RENBP gene.

The gene product inhibits renin activity by forming a dimer with renin, a complex known as high molecular weight renin. The encoded protein contains a leucine zipper domain, which is essential for its dimerization with renin. The gene product can catalyze the interconversion of N-acetylglucosamine to N-acetylmannosamine, indicating that it is a GlcNAc 2-epimerase. Transcript variants utilizing alternative promoters have been described in the literature.
