= Dynamic stereochemistry =

In chemistry, dynamic stereochemistry studies the effect of stereochemistry on the reaction rate of a chemical reaction. Stereochemistry is involved in:

- stereospecific reactions
- stereoselective or asymmetric reactions
- racemisation processes
