= Descriptor (chemistry) =

Type of notational prefix in chemical nomenclature

In chemical nomenclature, a descriptor is a notational prefix placed before the systematic substance name, which describes the configuration or the stereochemistry of the molecule. Some of the listed descriptors should not be used in publications, as they no longer accurately correspond with the recommendations of the IUPAC. Stereodescriptors are often used in combination with locants to clearly identify a chemical structure unambiguously.

The descriptors, usually placed at the beginning of the systematic name, are not taken into account in the alphabetical sorting.

== Configuration descriptors ==
=== cis, trans ===
cis (left) and trans (right) configured double bond in maleic acid and fumaric acid.

cis (left) and trans (right) isomerism in a ring system.

The descriptors cis (Latin, on this side of) and trans (Latin, over, beyond) are used in various contexts for the description of chemical configurations:

In organic structural chemistry, the configuration of a double bond can be described with cis and trans, in case it has a simple substitution pattern with only two residues. The position of two residues relative to one another at different points in a ring system or a larger molecule can also be described with cis and trans if the structure's configuration is rigid and does not allow simple inversion.

In inorganic complex chemistry, the descriptors cis and trans are used to characterize the positional isomers in octahedral complexes with A_{2}B_{4}X configuration or square planar complexes with A_{2}B_{2}X configuration.

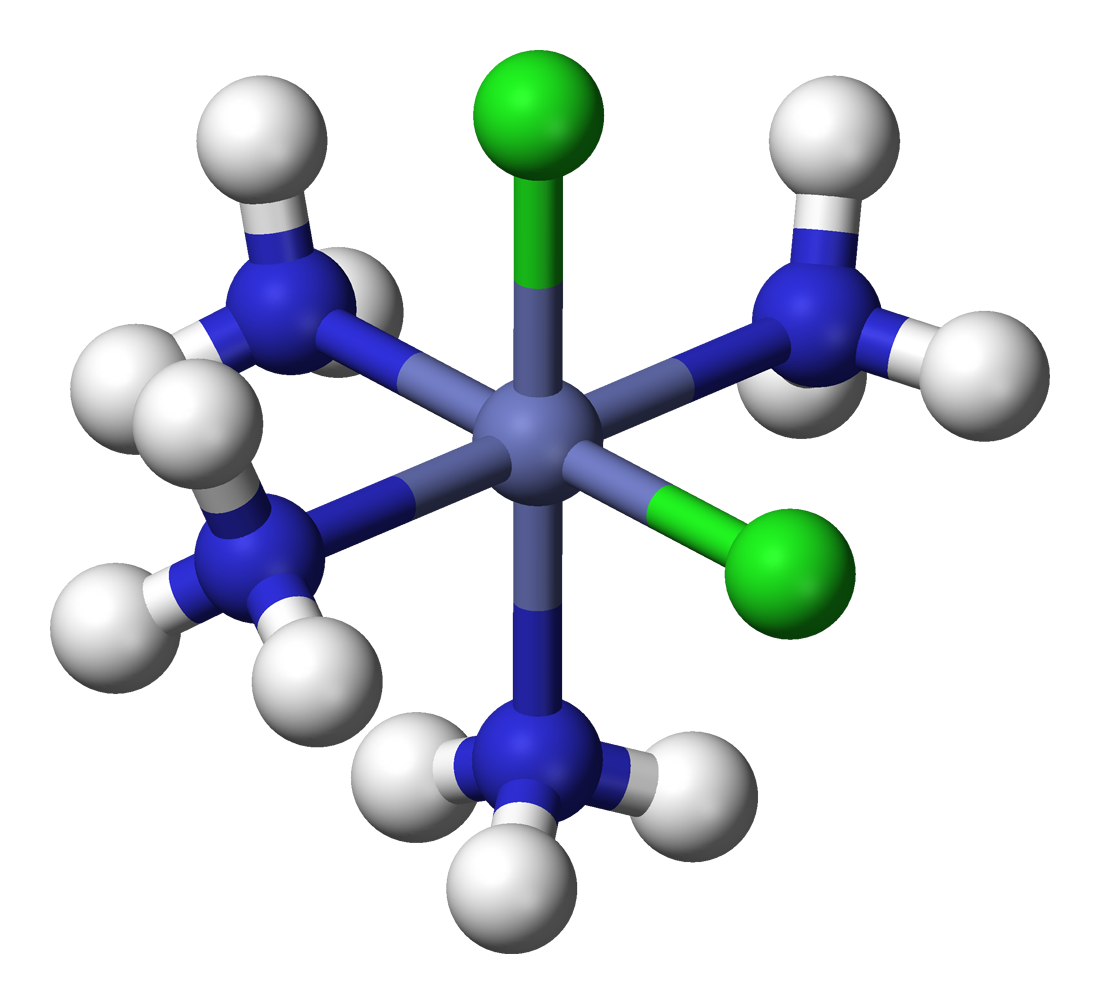
Octahedral complex with cis configuration

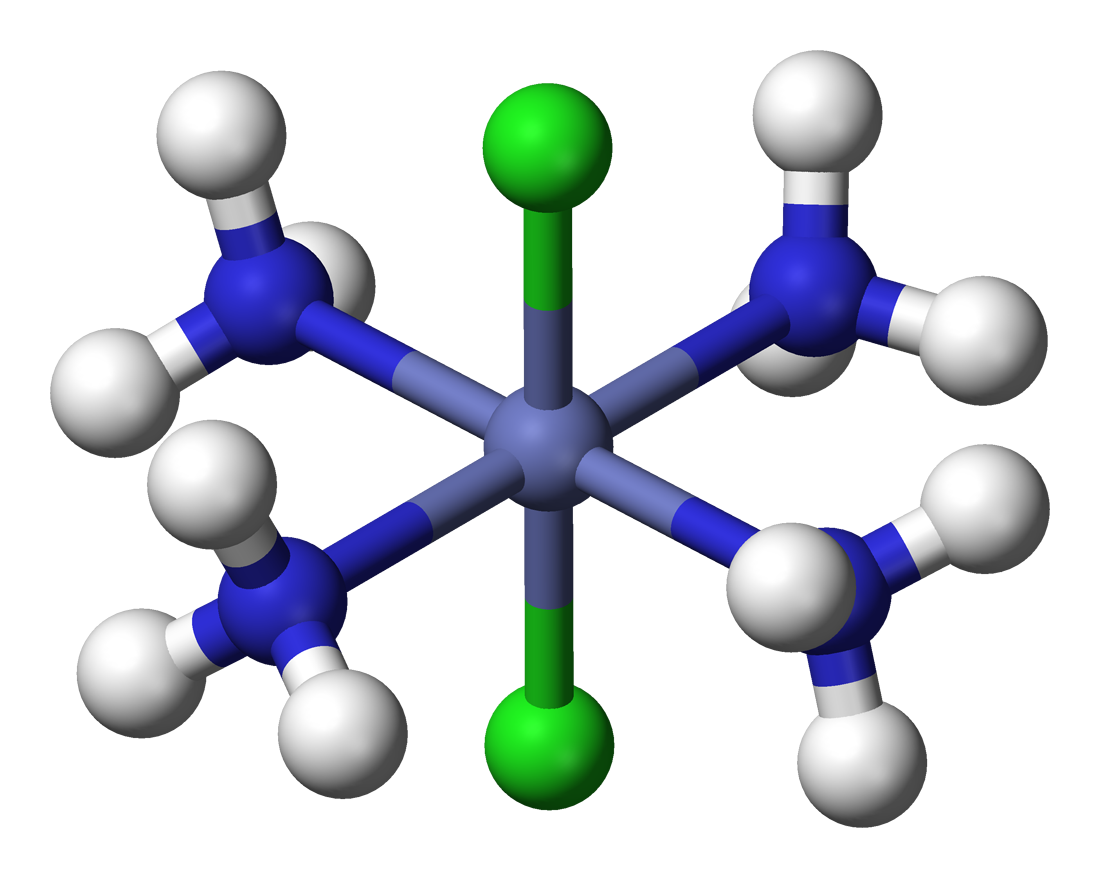
Octahedral complex with trans configuration

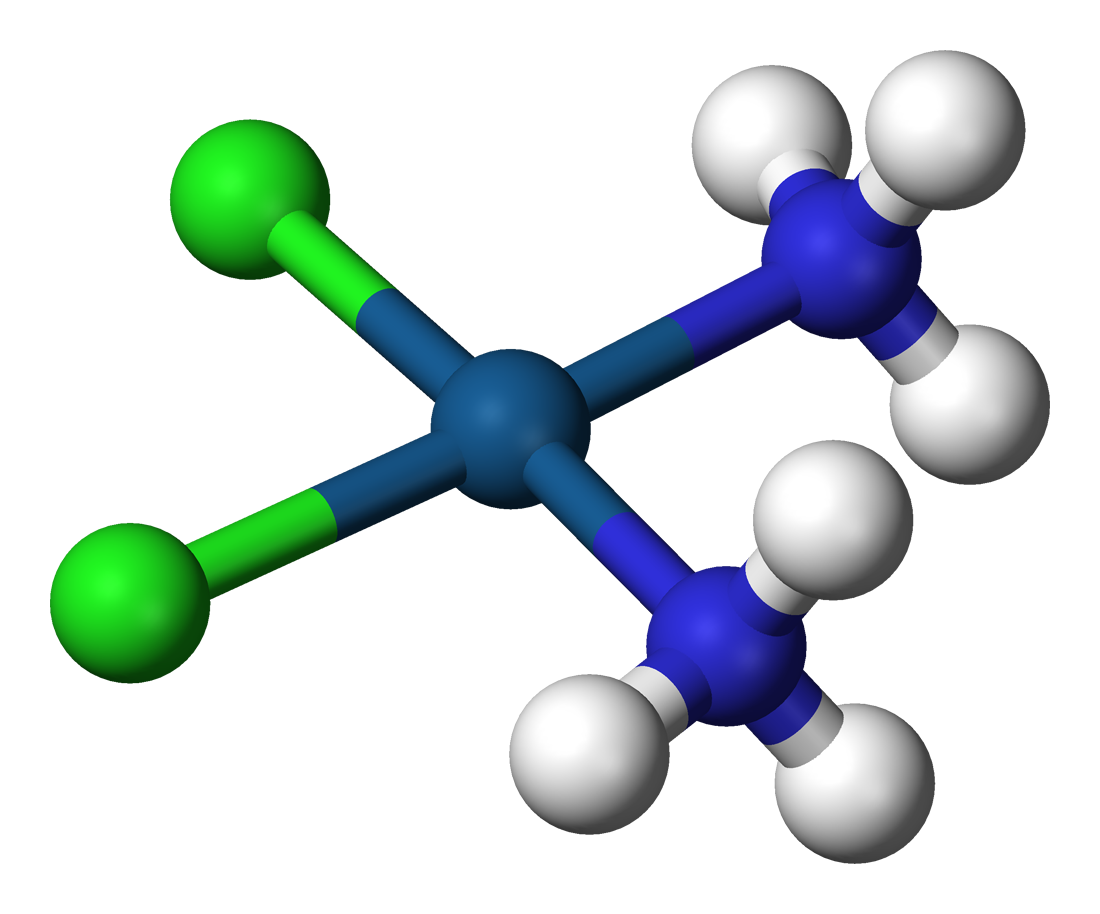
Square-planar complex: cisplatin

The typographic presentation of cis and trans is italicised and in lower case letters.

The cis/trans nomenclature is not unambiguous for more highly substituted double bonds and is nowadays largely replaced by the (E)/(Z) nomenclature.

=== (E), (Z) ===
Violet leaf aldehyde, systematic name (E,Z)-nona-2,6-dienal, is a compound having one (E)- and one (Z)-configured double bond

The descriptors (E) (from German entgegen, 'opposite') and (Z) (from German zusammen, 'together') are used to provide a distinct description of the substitution pattern for alkenes, cumulenes or other double bond systems such as oximes.

For the attribution of (E) or (Z) is based on the relative position of the two substituents of highest priority are on each side of the double bond, while the priority is based on the Cahn–Ingold–Prelog (CIP) nomenclature. The (E)/(Z) nomenclature can be applied to any double bond systems (including those with heteroatoms). The descriptors (E) and (Z) are always capitalized, set italic, and surrounded by parentheses that are set as normal just like additional locants or commas.

=== o-, m-, p- ===
o-Cresol	m-Cresol	p-Cresol

The abbreviation o- (short for ortho, from Ancient Greek ὀρθός, meaning "upright, straight"), m- (meta, μετά, (roughly) "between") and p- (para, παρά, "adjoining, to the side") describe the three possible positional isomers of two substituents on a benzene ring. These are usually two independent single substituents, but in case of fused ring systems, ortho-fusing is also mentioned unless the substitution pattern is regarded in the name like in [2.2]paracyclophane. In IUPAC systematic nomenclature, o-, m- and p- are generally replaced by numeric locants (1,3-dinitrobenzene instead of m-dinitrobenzene).

o-, m- and p- (written out ortho-, meta- and para-) are written in lowercase letters and italic.

=== exo, endo ===
2-endo-bromo-7-syn-fluoro- bicyclo[2.2.1]heptane	2-exo-bromo-7-syn-fluoro- bicyclo[2.2.1]heptane
2-endo-bromo-7-anti-fluoro- bicyclo[2.2.1]heptane	2-exo-bromo-7-anti-fluoro- bicyclo[2.2.1]heptane

exo (from Greek = outside) or endo (from Greek endon = inside) denotes the relative configuration of bridged bicyclic compounds. The position of a substituent in the main ring relative to the shortest bridge is decisive for the assignment of exo or endo (according to IUPAC: the bridge with the highest locant digits in the bridged ring system). The substituent to be classified is attributed with the exo descriptor when facing the bridge. It is endo configured when facing away from the bridge. If two different substituents are located on the same C atom, the exo/endo assignment is based on the substituent with higher priority according to the CIP rules.

=== syn, anti ===
If a bridged bicyclic system carries a substituent at the shortest bridge, the exo or endo descriptor can not be used for its assignment. Such isomers are classified by the syn/anti notation. If the substituent to be assigned points towards the ring with the highest number of segments it is syn configured (from Greek syn = together). Otherwise it is attributed with the anti descriptor (Greek anti = against). If both rings possess an equal number of segments the ring with the most significant substituent according to the CIP rules is chosen.

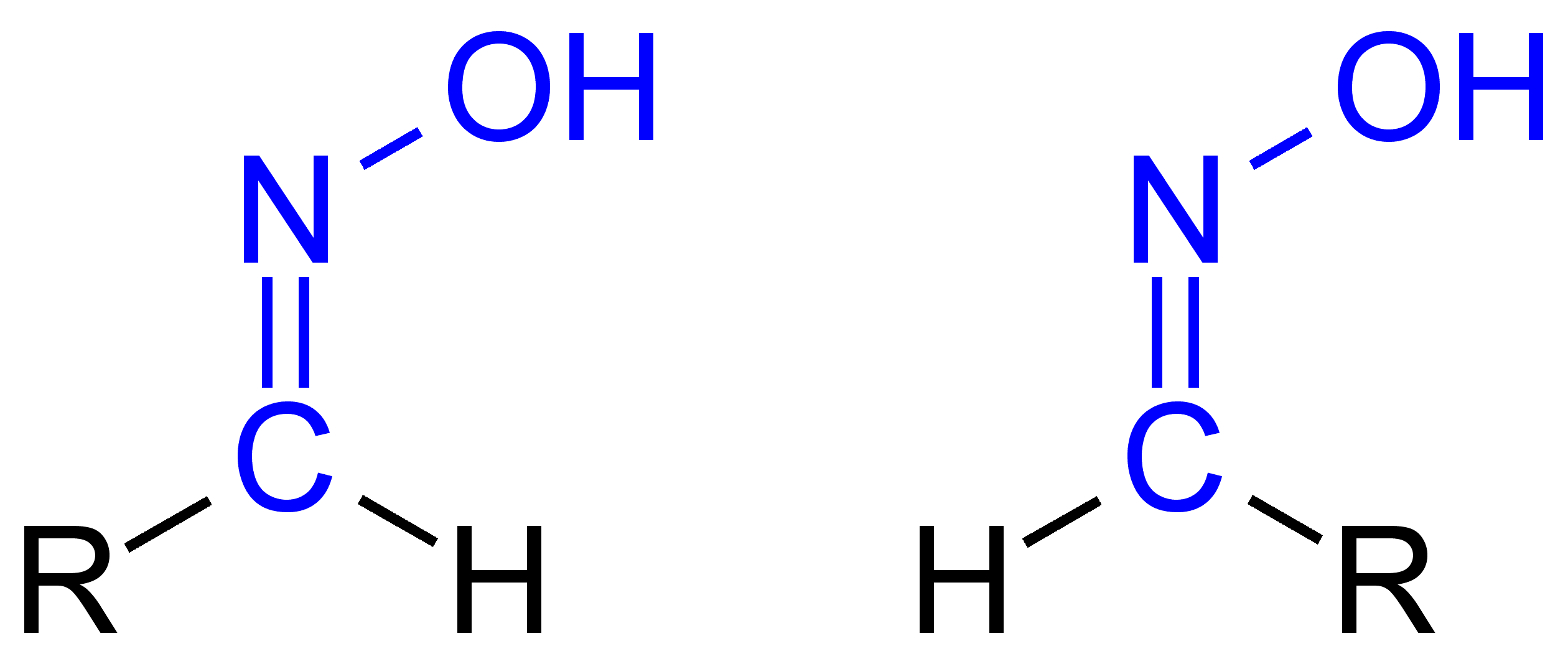
Isomerie der Aldoxime: links ein früher als syn-, heute als (E)-konfiguriert zu beschreibendes Aldoxim, rechts das entsprechende (Z)- (veraltet: anti)-Isomer.

The use of syn and anti to indicate the configuration of double bonds is nowadays obsolete, especially in case of aldoximes and hydrazones derived from aldehydes. Here, the compounds were designated as syn configured when the aldehyde H and the O (of the oxime) or the N (of the hydrazone) were cis aligned. These compounds are now described by the (E)/(Z) nomenclature. Aldoximes and hydrazones classified as syn are therefore by now described as (E) configurated.

When talking of diastereomers, syn and anti are used to describe groups on the same or opposite sites in zigzag projection, see Diastereomer#Syn / anti

syn and anti are always written small and italic, locants (if used) are placed in front of the word and separated by hyphens.

=== fac, mer ===
The terms fac (from Latin facies, 'external face') and mer (from 'meridional') can specify the arrangement of three identical ligands around the central atom in octahedral complexes. Today, this nomenclature is considered obsolete, but is still permissible. The prefix fac describes the situation when the three identical ligands occupy the three vertices of an octahedron triangular surface. In mer configuration the three ligands span a plane in which the central atom is located.

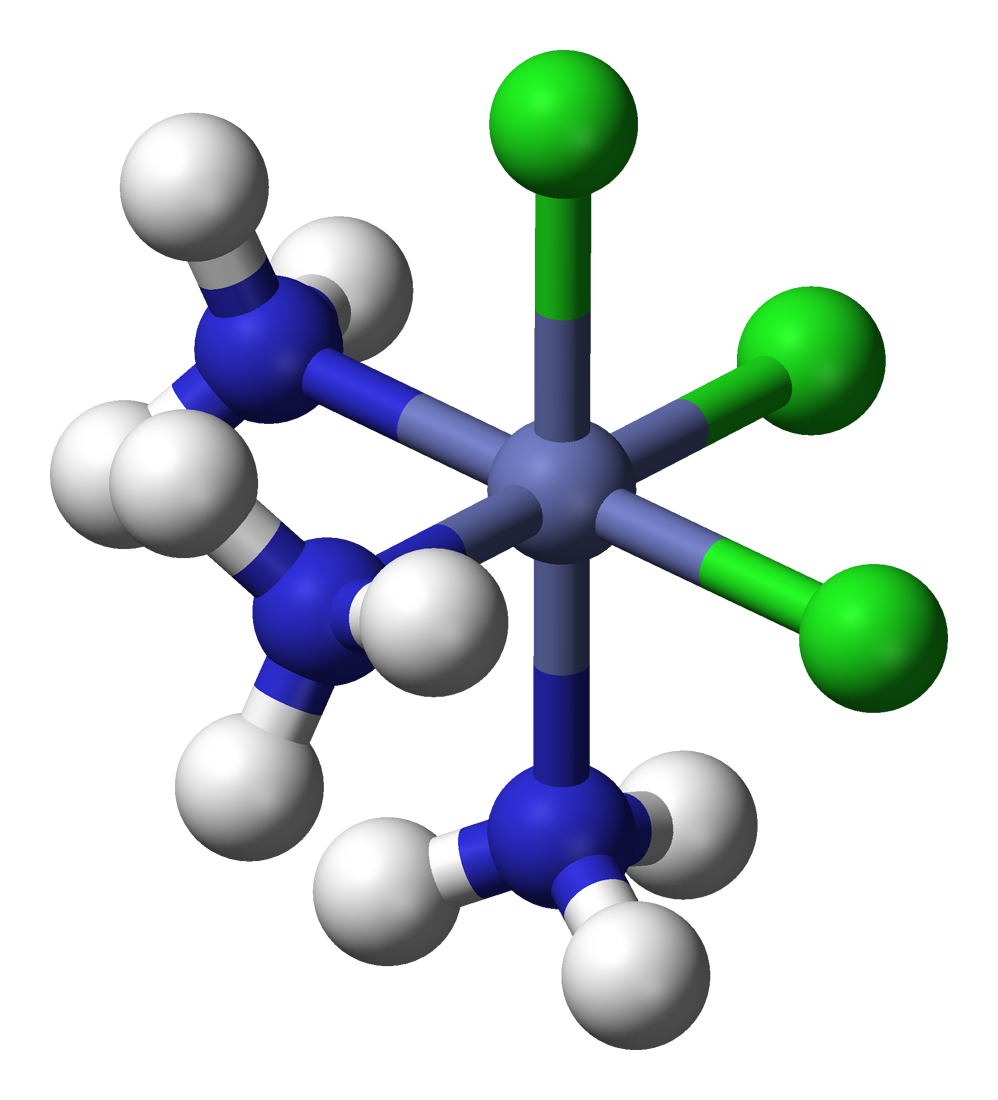
fac-[CoCl_{3}(NH_{3})_{3}]

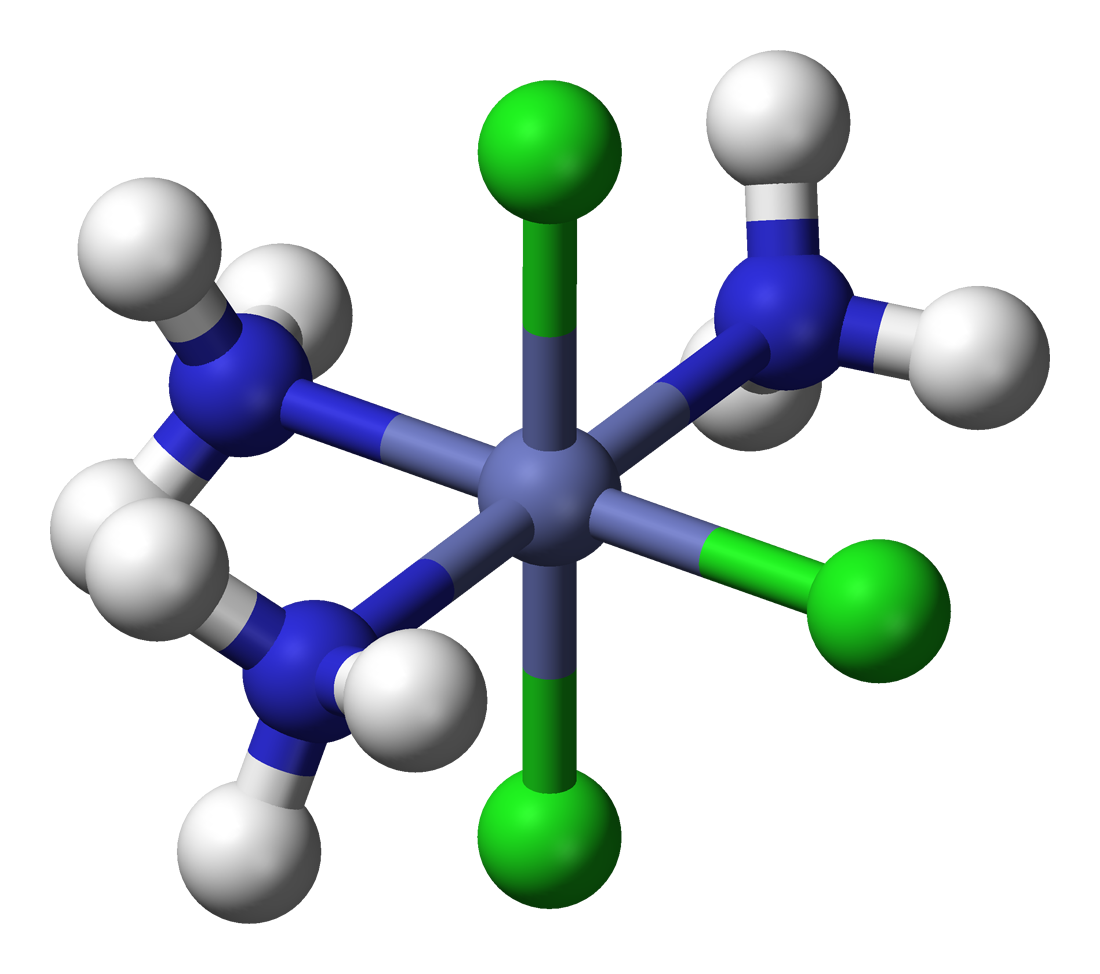
mer-[CoCl_{3}(NH_{3})_{3}]

fac and mer are prefixed in small and italic to the complex name.

=== n, iso, neo, cyclo ===
The prefixes n (normal), iso (from Ancient Greek ἴσος, meaning "equal"), neo (νέος, "young, new") and cyclo (κύκλος, "circle") are primarily used to describe the arrangement of atoms, usually of carbon atoms in carbon skeleton. n, iso and neo are no longer used in the systematic nomenclature, but still frequently in trivial names and in laboratory jargon.

The prefix n describes a straight-chain carbon skeleton without branches, whereas iso describes a branched skeleton, without specifying any further details. More generally, iso is a compound which is isomeric to the n compound (a compound in which individual atoms or atomic groups are rearranged)

neo is a non-specific term for "new", usually synthetically produced substances or isomers of long-known n compounds or natural substances (for example neomenthol derived from menthol or neoabietic acid from abietic acid). According to IUPAC neo is only recommended in neopentane or the neopentyl residue.

cyclo is a frequently used prefix for all cyclic and heterocyclic compounds. In many proper names of chemical substances cyclo is not used as a prefix but directly part of the name, for example in cyclohexane or cyclooctatetraene.

n-pentane

Isopentane

Neopentane

cyclopentane

While n, iso and neo are written in small and italic letters, for cyclo this is only the case in inorganic compounds. In organic compounds, "cyclo" is frequently used as a name component, not separated by a hyphen and also considered in alphabetical sorting.

=== sec-, tert- ===
The prefixes sec and tert are used to indicate the substituent environment in a molecule. Thus, not the exact position of the substituent is described but only the substitution pattern of the adjacent atom (usually a carbon atom). In n-butanol, the OH group is attached to a primary carbon atom, in sec-butanol to a secondary carbon and in tert-butanol to a tertiary carbon atom.

n-Butanol

sec-Butanol

tert-Butanol

The terms sec and tert are considered obsolete and should only be used for unsubstituted sec-butoxy, sec-butyl or tert-butyl groups. There are various spellings such as "sec-butyl", "s-butyl", "sBu" or "bus" which are also considered obsolete.

=== spiro ===
Spiro[4.5]decane

The prefix "spiro" followed by a Von-Baeyer descriptor describes in the nomenclature of organic compounds ring systems linked by only one common atom, the spiro atom. If several spiro atoms are present in the molecule, the prefix "spiro" is provided with a prefix ("dispiro", "trispiro", etc.) corresponding to the number of spiro atoms. Typically "spiro" is set as normal.

=== catena ===
The term catena (Latin: "chain") is used in the inorganic nomenclature to describe linear, chain-like polymers from identical polyatomic units. One example is are catenatriphosphazenes. Related compounds in organic chemistry are the catenanes.

=== sn ===
The notation sn stands for stereospecific numbering, and indicates a particular way of numbering the carbon atoms in a molecule based on glycerol.

== Stereodescriptors of absolute configurations ==
=== (R), (S) ===
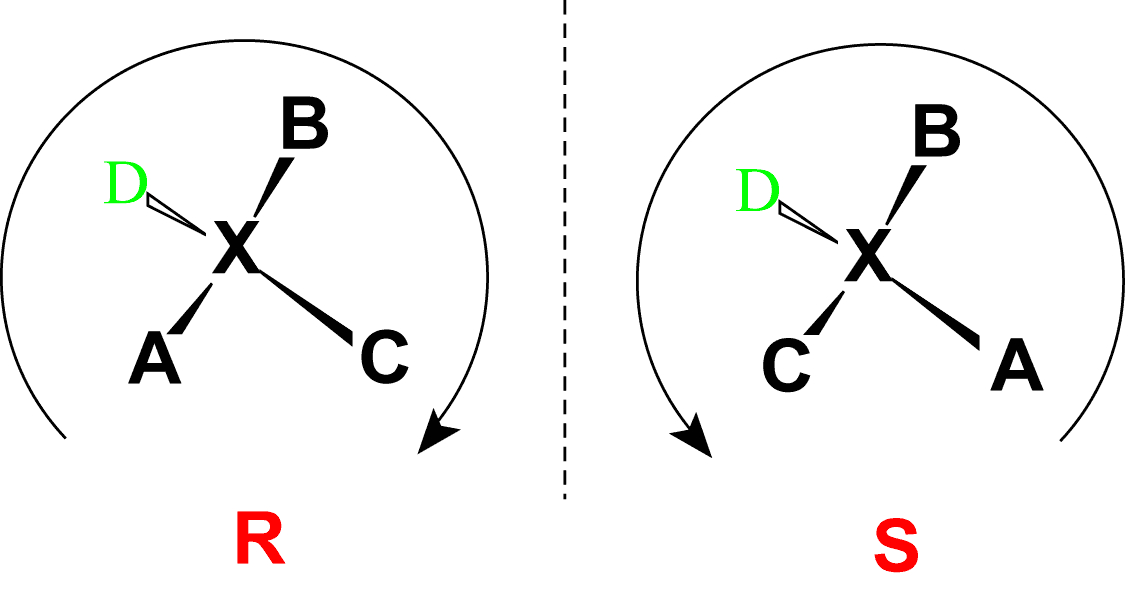
Configuration assignment of the stereo center "X", the substituents are decreasingly prioritized from "A" → "D" according to the CIP rules.

The stereochemical descriptors (R) (from Latin rectus = right) and (S) (from lat. sinister = left) are used to describe the absolute configuration of a stereocenter (usually a chiral carbon atom). For this purpose, all substituents at the stereocentre are prioritized according to the CIP rules and the substituent with the lowest priority ("D") is pointed backwards (away from the viewing direction). The stereocenter is (S) configured if the remaining substituents describe a circle descending in priority ("A" → "B" → "C") to the left. The (R) configuration is assigned to the stereocenter if the direction of rotation is directed to the right.

If one molecule contains several stereocenters, a locant must be placed before the descriptor (for example, in (1R, 2S)-2-amino-1-phenylpropan-1-ol, the systematic designation of norephedrine). If all stereocenters are configured the same, the naming of the locants can be omitted in favor of an "all-R" or "(all-S)" spelling.

Typographically, (R) and (S) are placed in uppercase and italic; the frequently preceding locants, the enclosing round brackets and the commas, on the other hand, as normal.

=== (r), (s) ===
Example molecules having pseudoasymmetric atoms

Tropine

All-cis 1,2,3-trichlorocyclopentane

The descriptors (r) and (s) are used to describe the absolute configuration of pseudoasymmetric centers. Pseudoasymmetry occurs when four different substituents are attached to one carbon atom, two of which differ only by their absolute stereochemical configuration. Examples of such are meso compounds such the tropane alkaloids; the parent compound is tropine, whose systematic name is (1R, 3r, 5S)-8-methyl-8-azabicyclo[3.2.1]octane-3-ol. In this structure, the C3 atom—the carbon to which the hydroxyl group is attached—is pseudo-asymmetric; therefore, the stereochemical descriptor in the systematic name is written in lower-case italics rather than upper-case italics as for regular chiral atoms.

=== D-, L- ===
Construction of the Fischer projection

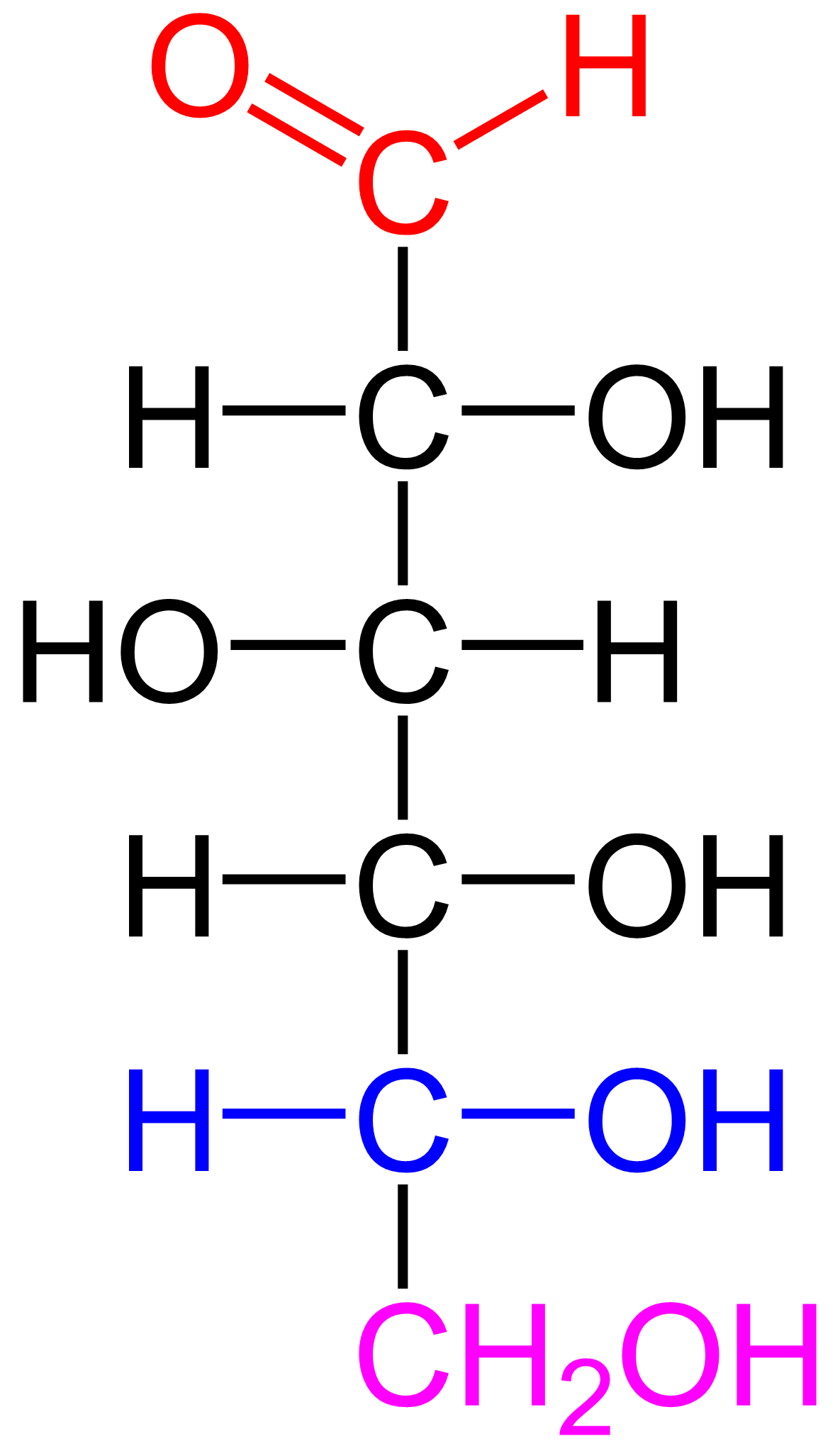
D-glucose in the Fischer projection.
Red: Group with highest priority,
Blue: For determination of D-/L- relevant group,
Violet: Group with achiral carbon atom

The stereodescriptors D- (from Latin dexter, right) and L- (Latin laevus, left) are used to describe the configuration of α-amino acids and sugars. First, the three-dimensional molecule must be transformed in a defined notation as a two-dimensional image ("Fischer projection"). For this, the C atom with the highest priority according to the normal nomenclature rules is arranged on top and the further carbon chain is arranged vertically underneath. The chiral C-atom most remote from the group with the highest priority is used for the assignment of D- or L-. If the residue located on this carbon atom (usually an OH group) points to the left, the molecule originates from the L-series. If the residue points to the right, the descriptor D- is used.

The descriptors D- and L- are written as small capitals and separated by a hyphen from the rest of the name.

=== d-, l- ===
Sometimes the small capital D- and L- stereodescriptors mentioned above are mistakenly confused with the obsolete italic d- and l- stereodescriptors, which are equivalent with dextrorotatory and levorotatory optical rotation, i.e. (+)- and (−)- stereodescriptors, respectively.
