= Meso compound =

Optically inactive isomer in a set of stereoisomers

A meso compound or meso isomer is an optically inactive isomer in a set of stereoisomers, at least two of which are optically active. This means that despite containing two or more stereocenters, the molecule is not chiral. A meso compound is superposable on its mirror image. (Note: Not to be confused with superimposable, as any two objects can be superimposed over one another regardless of whether they are the same.) Two objects can be superposed if all aspects of the objects coincide and it does not produce a "(+)" or "(-)" reading when analyzed with a polarimeter.

For example, tartaric acid can exist as any of three stereoisomers depicted below in a Fischer projection. Of the four colored pictures at the top of the diagram, the first two represent the meso compound (the 2R,3S and 2S,3R isomers are equivalent), followed by the optically active pair of levotartaric acid (L-(R,R)-(+)-tartaric acid) and dextrotartaric acid (D-(S,S)-(-)-tartaric acid). The meso compound is bisected by an internal plane of symmetry that is not present for the non-meso isomers (indicated by an X). That is, on reflecting the meso compound through a mirror plane perpendicular to the screen, the same stereochemistry is obtained; this is not the case for the non-meso tartaric acid, which generates the other enantiomer. The meso compound must not be confused with a 50:50 racemic mixture of the two optically-active compounds, although neither will rotate light in a polarimeter.

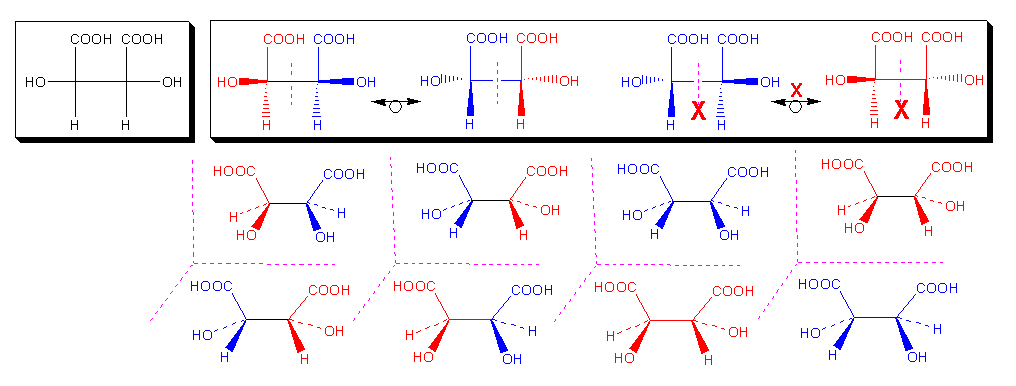

It is a requirement for two of the stereocenters in a meso compound to have at least two substituents in common (although having this characteristic does not necessarily mean that the compound is meso). For example, in 2,4-pentanediol, both the second and fourth carbon atoms, which are stereocenters, have all four substituents in common.

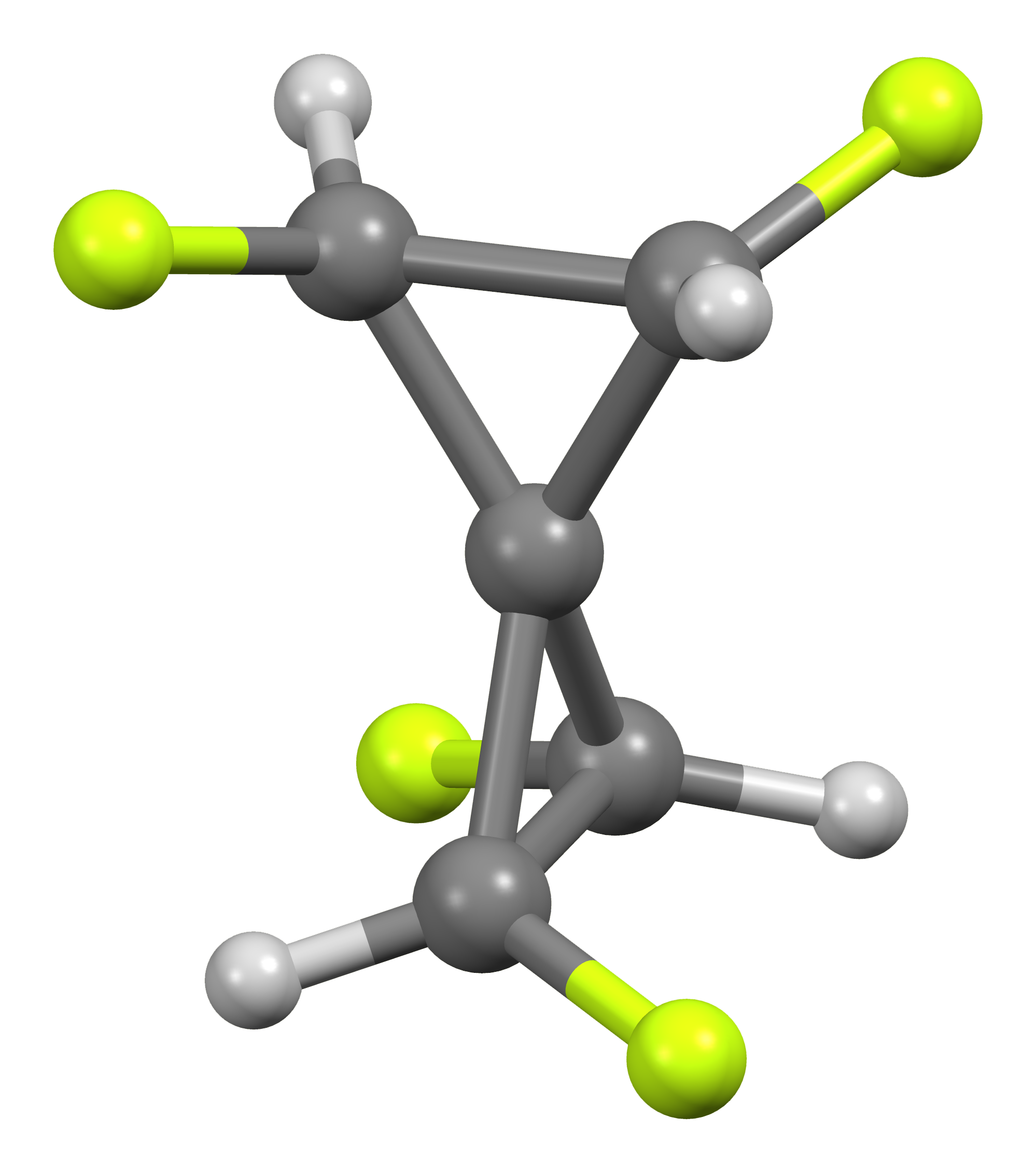
One of the two meso isomers of 1,2,3,4-tetrafluorospiropentane, with S_{4} symmetry.

Since a meso isomer has a superposable mirror image, a compound with a total of n chiral centers cannot attain the theoretical maximum of 2^{n} stereoisomers if one of the stereoisomers is meso.

A meso isomer does not necessarily need to have a mirror plane. It may have an inversion or a rotoreflexion symmetry such as S_{4}. For example, there are two meso isomers of 1,4-difluoro-2,5-dichlorocyclohexane but neither has a mirror plane, and there are two meso isomers of 1,2,3,4-tetrafluorospiropentane (see figure).

== Etymology ==
The name is derived from the Greek mésos meaning “middle”.

== Cyclic meso compounds ==
1,2-substituted cyclopropane has a meso cis-isomer (molecule has a mirror plane) and two trans-enantiomers:

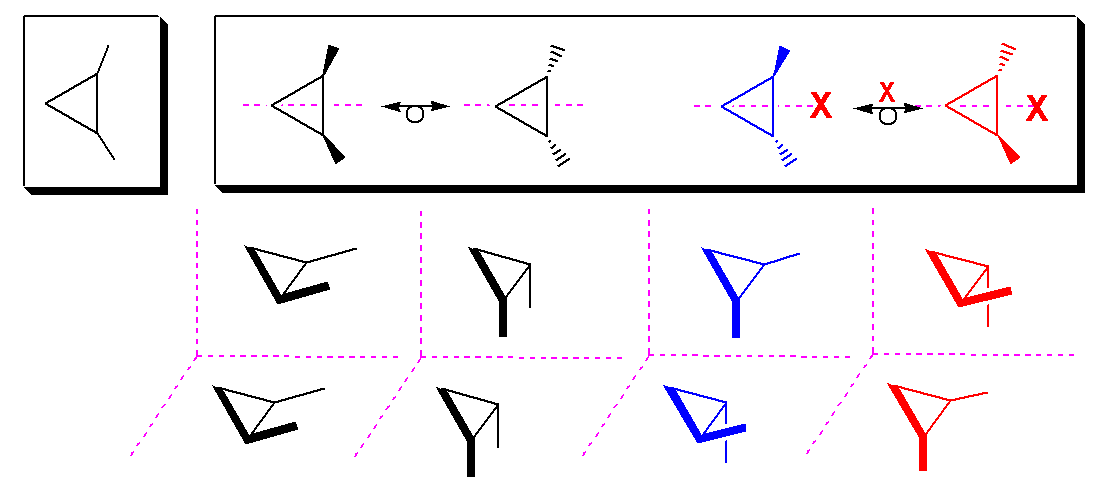

The two cis stereoisomers of 1,2-substituted cyclohexanes behave like meso compounds at room temperature in most cases. At room temperature, most 1,2-disubstituted cyclohexanes undergo rapid ring flipping (exceptions being rings with bulky substituents), and as a result, the two cis stereoisomers behave chemically identically with chiral reagents. At low temperatures, however, this is not the case, as the activation energy for the ring-flip cannot be overcome, and they therefore behave like enantiomers. Also noteworthy is the fact that when a cyclohexane undergoes a ring flip, the absolute configurations of the stereocenters do not change.

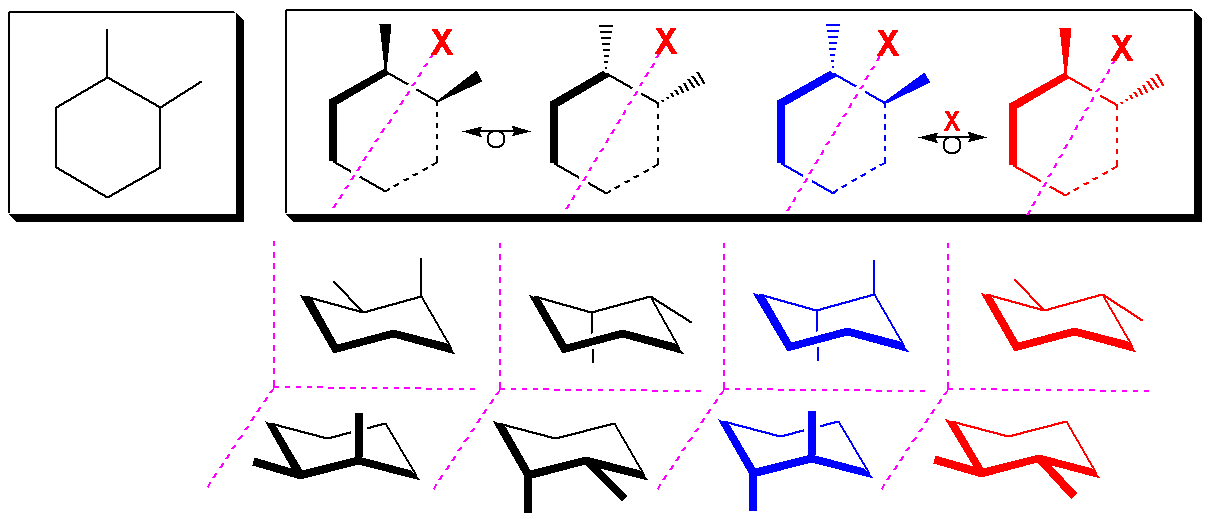
1,2-dimethylcyclohexane
