= Absolute configuration =

Chemical notation for the handedness of a chiral molecule or group

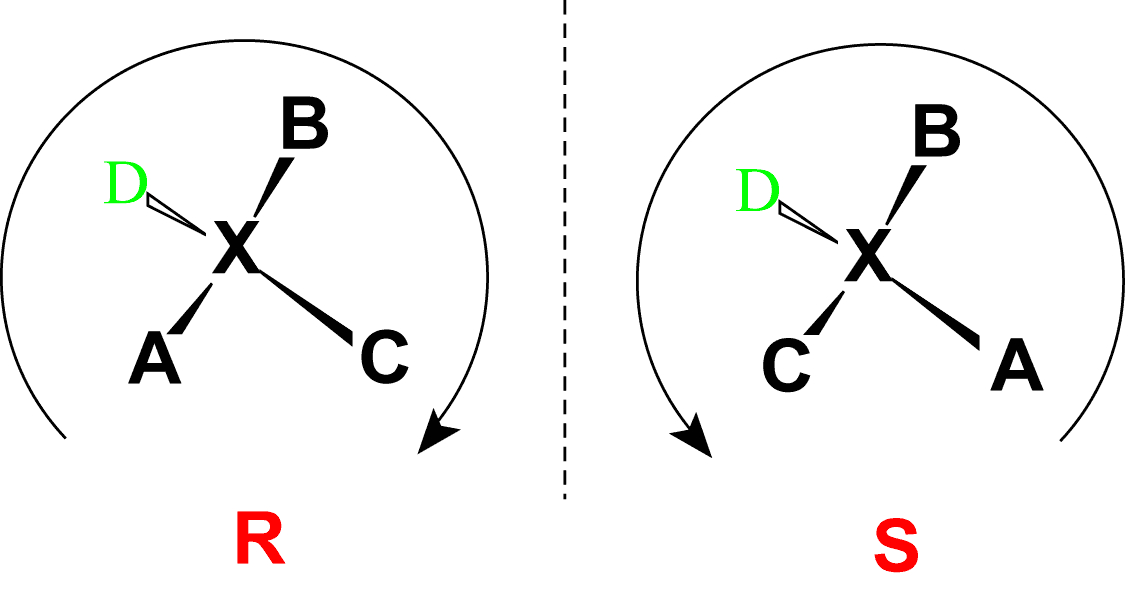
Absolute configuration showing the determination of the R and S descriptors

In chemistry, absolute configuration is the spatial arrangement of atoms within a molecular entity (or group) that is chiral, and its resultant stereochemical description. Absolute configuration is typically relevant in organic molecules where carbon is bonded to four different substituents. This type of construction creates two possible enantiomers. Absolute configuration uses a set of rules to describe the relative positions of each bond around the chiral center atom. The most common labeling method uses the descriptors R or S and is based on the Cahn–Ingold–Prelog priority rules. R and S refer to rectus and sinister, Latin for right and left, respectively.

Enantiomers can differ in their chemical properties, but are identical in their physical properties, which can make distinguishing them challenging. Absolute configurations for a chiral molecule (in pure form) are most often obtained by X-ray crystallography, although with some important limitations. All enantiomerically pure chiral molecules crystallise in one of the 65 Sohncke groups (chiral space groups). Alternative techniques include optical rotatory dispersion, vibrational circular dichroism, ultraviolet-visible spectroscopy, the use of chiral shift reagents in proton NMR and Coulomb explosion imaging.

== History ==
Until 1951, it was not possible to obtain the absolute configuration of chiral compounds. It was at some time arbitrarily decided that (+)-glyceraldehyde was the D-enantiomer. The configuration of other chiral compounds was then related to that of (+)-glyceraldehyde by sequences of chemical reactions. For example, oxidation of (+)-glyceraldehyde (1) with mercury oxide gives (−)-glyceric acid (2), a reaction that does not alter the stereocenter. Thus the absolute configuration of (−)-glyceric acid must be the same as that of (+)-glyceraldehyde. Oxidation of (+)-isoserine (3) by nitrous acid gives (−)-glyceric acid, establishing that (+)-isoserine also has the same absolute configuration. (+)-Isoserine can be converted by a two-stage process of bromination to (−)-3-bromo-2-hydroxy-propanoic acid (4) and zinc reduction to give (−)-lactic acid (5), therefore (−)-lactic acid also has the same absolute configuration. If a reaction gave the enantiomer of a known configuration, as indicated by the opposite sign of optical rotation, it would indicate that the absolute configuration is inverted.

In 1951, Johannes Martin Bijvoet for the first time used in X-ray crystallography the effect of anomalous dispersion, which is now referred to as resonant scattering, to determine absolute configuration. The compound investigated was (+)-sodium rubidium tartrate and from its configuration (R,R) it was deduced that the original guess for (+)-glyceraldehyde was correct.

Despite the tremendous and unique impact on access to molecular structures, X-ray crystallography poses some challenges. The process of crystallization of the target molecules is time- and resource-intensive, and can not be applied to relevant systems of interest such as many biomolecules (some proteins are an exception) and in situ catalysts. Another important limitation is that the molecule must contain "heavy" atoms (for example, bromine) to enhance the scattering. Furthermore, crucial distortions of the signal arise from the influence of the nearest neighbors in any crystal structure and of solvents used during the crystallization process.

Just recently, novel techniques have been introduced to directly investigate the absolute configuration of single molecules in gas-phase, usually in combination with ab initio quantum mechanical theoretical calculations, therefore overcoming some of the limitations of the X-ray crystallography.

== Conventions ==
=== By absolute configuration: R- and S- ===
Examples of absolute configuration of some carbohydrates and amino acids according to Fischer projection (D/L system) and Cahn–Ingold–Prelog priority rules (R/S system)

The R/S system is an important nomenclature system for specifying enantiomer topology. This approach labels each chiral center R or S according to a system by which its substituents are each assigned a priority, according to the Cahn–Ingold–Prelog priority rules (CIP), based on atomic number. When the center is oriented so that the lowest-priority substituent of the four is pointed away from the viewer, the viewer will then see two possibilities: if the priority of the remaining three substituents decreases in clockwise direction, it is labeled R (for Latin: rectus – right); if it decreases in counterclockwise direction, it is S (for Latin: sinister – left).

(R) or (S) is written in italics and parentheses. If there are multiple chiral carbons, e.g. (1R,4S), a number specifies the location of the carbon preceding each configuration.

The R/S system also has no fixed relation to the D/L system. For example, the side-chain one of serine contains a hydroxyl group, −OH. If a thiol group, −SH, were swapped in for it, the D/L labeling would, by its definition, not be affected by the substitution. But this substitution would invert the molecule's R/S labeling, because the CIP priority of CH_{2}OH is lower than that for CO_{2}H but the CIP priority of CH_{2}SH is higher than that for CO_{2}H. For this reason, the D/L system remains in common use in certain areas of biochemistry, such as amino acid and carbohydrate chemistry, because it is convenient to have the same chiral label for the commonly occurring structures of a given type of structure in higher organisms. In the D/L system, nearly all naturally occurring amino acids are all L, while naturally occurring carbohydrates are nearly all D. All proteinogenic amino acids are S, except for cysteine, which is R.

=== By optical rotation: (+)- and (−)- or d- and l- ===
An enantiomer can be named by the direction in which it rotates the plane of polarized light. Clockwise rotation of the light traveling toward the viewer is labeled (+) enantiomer. Its mirror-image is labeled (−). The (+) and (−) isomers have been also termed d- and l- (for dextrorotatory and levorotatory); but, naming with d- and l- is easy to confuse with D- and L- labeling and is therefore discouraged by IUPAC.

=== By relative configuration: D- and L- ===
An optical isomer can be named by the spatial configuration of its atoms. The D/L system (named after Latin dexter and laevus, right and left), not to be confused with the d- and l-system, see above, does this by relating the molecule to glyceraldehyde. Glyceraldehyde is chiral itself and its two isomers are labeled D and L (typically typeset in small caps in published work). Certain chemical manipulations can be performed on glyceraldehyde without affecting its configuration, and its historical use for this purpose (possibly combined with its convenience as one of the smallest commonly used chiral molecules) has resulted in its use for nomenclature. In this system, compounds are named by analogy to glyceraldehyde, which, in general, produces unambiguous designations, but is easiest to see in the small biomolecules similar to glyceraldehyde. One example is the chiral amino acid alanine, which has two optical isomers, and they are labeled according to which isomer of glyceraldehyde they come from. On the other hand, glycine, the amino acid derived from glyceraldehyde, has no optical activity, as it is not chiral (it's achiral).

The D/L labeling is unrelated to (+)/(−) – it does not indicate which enantiomer is dextrorotatory and which is levorotatory. Rather, it indicates the compound's stereochemistry relative to that of the dextrorotatory or levorotatory enantiomer of glyceraldehyde. The dextrorotatory isomer of glyceraldehyde is, in fact, the D- isomer. Nine of the nineteen L-amino acids commonly found in proteins are dextrorotatory (at a wavelength of 589 nm), and D-fructose is also referred to as levulose because it is levorotatory. A rule of thumb for determining the D/L isomeric form of an amino acid is the "CORN" rule. The groups

COOH, R, NH_{2} and H (where R is the side-chain)

are arranged around the chiral center carbon atom. With the hydrogen atom away from the viewer, if the arrangement of the CO→R→N groups around the carbon atom as center is counter-clockwise, then it is the L form. If the arrangement is clockwise, it is the D form. As usual, if the molecule itself is oriented differently, for example, with H towards the viewer, the pattern may be reversed. The L form is the usual one found in natural proteins. For most amino acids, the L form corresponds to an S absolute stereochemistry, but is R instead for certain side-chains.

== See also ==
- Molecular configuration
