= Enantiomer =

Stereoisomers that are nonsuperposable mirror images of each other

(S)-(+)-lactic acid (left) and (R)-(–)-lactic acid (right) are non-superposable mirror images of each other.

In chemistry, an enantiomer (/ɪˈnænti.əmər, ɛ-, -oʊ-/ ih-NAN-tee-ə-mər), also known as an optical isomer, antipode, or optical antipode, is one of a pair of molecular entities which are mirror images of each other and non-superposable.

Enantiomer molecules are like right and left hands: one cannot be superposed onto the other without first being converted to its mirror image. It is solely a relationship of chirality and the permanent three-dimensional relationships among molecules or other chemical structures: no amount of re-orientation of a molecule as a whole or conformational change converts one chemical into its enantiomer. Chemical structures with chirality rotate plane-polarized light. A mixture of equal amounts of each enantiomer, a racemic mixture or a racemate, does not rotate light.

Stereoisomers include both enantiomers and diastereomers. Diastereomers, like enantiomers, share the same molecular formula and are also non-superposable onto each other; however, they are not mirror images of each other.

In nature, most chiral compounds are present as only one enantiomer, such as amino acids—for example, only the L-isomer of alanine is incorporated into proteins.

== Naming conventions ==
There are three common naming conventions for specifying one of the two enantiomers (the absolute configuration) of a given chiral molecule: the R/S system is based on the geometry of the molecule; the (+)- and (−)- system (also written using the obsolete equivalents d- and l-) is based on its optical rotation properties; and the D/L system is based on the molecule's relationship to enantiomers of glyceraldehyde.

The R/S system is based on the molecule's geometry with respect to a chiral center. The R/S system is assigned to a molecule based on the priority rules assigned by Cahn–Ingold–Prelog priority rules, in which the group or atom with the largest atomic number is assigned the highest priority and the group or atom with the smallest atomic number is assigned the lowest priority.

The (+) or (−) symbol is used to specify a molecule's optical rotation — the direction in which the polarization of light rotates as it passes through a solution containing the molecule. When a molecule is denoted dextrorotatory, it rotates the plane of polarized light clockwise and can also be denoted as (+). When it is denoted as levorotatory, it rotates the plane of polarized light counterclockwise and can also be denoted as (−).

The Latin words for left are laevus and sinister, and the word for right is dexter (or rectus in the sense of correct or virtuous). The English word right is a cognate of rectus. This is the origin of the D/L and R/S notations and the employment of prefixes levo- and dextro- in common names.

In some contexts, the prefixes ar- and es- are used in the names. Examples include ketamine, arketamine, esketamine.

== Chirality centers ==
Fischer projection of meso-tartaric acid

The asymmetric atom is called a chirality center, a type of stereocenter. A chirality center is also called a chiral center or an asymmetric center. Some sources use the terms stereocenter, stereogenic center, stereogenic atom or stereogen to refer exclusively to a chirality center, while others use the terms more broadly to refer also to centers that result in diastereomers (stereoisomers that are not enantiomers).

Compounds that contain exactly one (or any odd number) of asymmetric atoms are always chiral. However, compounds that contain an even number of asymmetric atoms sometimes lack chirality because they are arranged in mirror-symmetric pairs, and are known as meso compounds. For instance, meso tartaric acid (shown on the right) has two asymmetric carbon atoms, but it does not exhibit enantiomerism because there is a mirror symmetry plane. But there exist forms of chirality that do not require asymmetric atoms, such as axial, planar, and helical chirality.

Even though a chiral molecule lacks reflection (C_{s}) and rotoreflection symmetries (S_{2n}), it can have other molecular symmetries, and its symmetry is described by one of the chiral point groups: C_{n}, D_{n}, T, O, or I. For example, hydrogen peroxide is chiral and has C_{2} (two-fold rotational) symmetry. A common chiral case is the point group C_{1}, meaning no symmetries, which is the case for lactic acid.

== Examples ==
Structures of the two enantiomeric forms (S left, R right) of mecoprop

Enantiomers of citalopram. The top is (R)-citalopram and the bottom is (S)-citalopram.

An example of such an enantiomer is the sedative thalidomide, which was sold in a number of countries around the world from 1957 until 1961. It was withdrawn from the market when it was found to cause birth defects. One enantiomer caused the desirable sedative effects, while the other, unavoidably present in equal quantities, caused birth defects.

The herbicide mecoprop is a racemic mixture, with the (R)-(+)-enantiomer ("Mecoprop-P", "Duplosan KV") possessing the herbicidal activity.

Another example is the antidepressant drugs escitalopram and citalopram. Citalopram is a racemate [1:1 mixture of (S)-citalopram and (R)-citalopram]; escitalopram [(S)-citalopram] is a pure enantiomer. The dosages for escitalopram are typically 1/2 of those for citalopram. Here, (S)-citalopram is called a chiral switch of Citalopram.

== Chiral drugs ==
Enantiopure compounds consist of only one of the two enantiomers. Enantiopurity is of practical importance since such compositions have improved therapeutic efficacy. The switch from a racemic drug to an enantiopure drug is called a chiral switch. In many cases, the enantiomers have distinct effects. One case is that of Propoxyphene. The enantiomeric pair of propoxyphene is separately sold by Eli Lilly and company. One of the partners is dextropropoxyphene, an analgesic agent (Darvon) and the other is called levopropoxyphene, an effective antitussive (Novrad). It is interesting to note that the trade names of the drugs, DARVON and NOVRAD, also reflect the chemical mirror-image relationship. In other cases, there may be no clinical benefit to the patient. In some jurisdictions, single-enantiomer drugs are separately patentable from the racemic mixture. It is possible that only one of the enantiomers is active. Or, it may be that both are active, in which case separating the mixture has no objective benefits, but extends the drug's patentability.

== Enantioselective preparations ==
In the absence of an effective enantiomeric environment (precursor, chiral catalyst, or kinetic resolution), separation of a racemic mixture into its enantiomeric components is impossible, although certain racemic mixtures spontaneously crystallize in the form of a racemic conglomerate, in which crystals of the enantiomers are physically segregated and may be separated mechanically. However, most racemates form crystals containing both enantiomers in a 1:1 ratio.

In his pioneering work, Louis Pasteur was able to isolate the isomers of sodium ammonium tartrate because the individual enantiomers crystallize separately from solution. To be sure, equal amounts of the enantiomorphic crystals are produced, but the two kinds of crystals can be separated with tweezers. This behavior is unusual. A less common method is by enantiomer self-disproportionation.

The second strategy is asymmetric synthesis: the use of various techniques to prepare the desired compound in high enantiomeric excess. Techniques encompassed include the use of chiral starting materials (chiral pool synthesis), the use of chiral auxiliaries and chiral catalysts, and the application of asymmetric induction. The use of enzymes (biocatalysis) may also produce the desired compound.

A third strategy is enantioconvergent synthesis, the synthesis of one enantiomer from a racemic precursor, utilizing both enantiomers. By making use of a chiral catalyst, both enantiomers of the reactant result in a single enantiomer of product.

Enantiomers may not be isolable if there is an accessible pathway for racemization (interconversion between enantiomorphs to yield a racemic mixture) at a given temperature and timescale. For example, amines with three distinct substituents are chiral, but with few exceptions (e.g. substituted N-chloroaziridines), they rapidly undergo "umbrella inversion" at room temperature, leading to racemization. If the racemization is fast enough, the molecule can often be treated as an achiral, averaged structure.

== Parity violation ==
For all intents and purposes, each enantiomer in a pair has the same energy. However, theoretical physics predicts that due to parity violation of the weak nuclear force (the only force in nature that can "tell left from right"), there is actually a minute difference in energy between enantiomers (on the order of 10^{−12} eV or 10^{−10} kJ/mol or less) due to the weak neutral current mechanism. This difference in energy is far smaller than energy changes caused by even small changes in molecular conformation, and far too small to measure by current technology, and is therefore chemically inconsequential. In the sense used by particle physicists, the "true" enantiomer of a molecule, which has exactly the same mass-energy content as the original molecule, is a mirror-image that is also built from antimatter (antiprotons, antineutrons, and positrons). Throughout this article, "enantiomer" is used only in the chemical sense of compounds of ordinary matter that are not superposable on their mirror image.

== Quasi-enantiomers ==
Quasi-enantiomers are molecular species that are not strictly enantiomers, but behave as if they were. In quasi-enantiomers, the majority of the molecule is reflected; however, an atom or group within the molecule is changed to a similar atom or group. Quasi-enantiomers can also be defined as molecules that have the potential to become enantiomers if an atom or group in the molecule were replaced. An example of quasi-enantiomers is (S)-bromobutane and (R)-iodobutane. Under normal conditions, the enantiomers for (S)-bromobutane and (R)-iodobutane are (R)-bromobutane and (S)-iodobutane respectively. Quasi-enantiomers also produce quasi-racemates, which are similar to normal racemates (see racemic mixture) in that they form an equal mixture of quasi-enantiomers.

Quasi-enantiomers have applications in parallel kinetic resolution.

== See also ==
- Chiral switch
- Crystal system
- Enantiopure drug
- Atropisomer
- Chirotechnology
- Chirality (physics)
- Diastereomer
- Dynamic stereochemistry
- Epimer
- Homochirality
- Molecular symmetry
- Stereochemistry
- Stereocenter
