= Stereochemistry =

Subdiscipline of chemistry

The different types of isomers. Stereochemistry focuses on stereoisomers.

Stereochemistry, a subdiscipline of chemistry, studies the spatial arrangement of atoms that form the structure of molecules and their manipulation. The study of stereochemistry focuses on the relationships between stereoisomers, which are defined as having the same molecular formula and sequence of bonded atoms (constitution) but differing in the geometric positioning of the atoms in space. For this reason, it is also known as 3D chemistry—the prefix "stereo-" means "three-dimensionality" because many of the types of stereochemistry are based on 3D geometric relationships. Stereochemistry applies to all kinds of compounds and ions, organic and inorganic species alike. Stereochemistry affects biological, physical, and supramolecular chemistry.

Stereochemistry also studies the reactivity of the molecules in question (dynamic stereochemistry).

Cahn–Ingold–Prelog priority rules are part of a system for describing a molecule's stereochemistry. They rank the atoms around a stereochemical region of a molecule in a standard way, allowing unambiguous descriptions of their relative positions in the molecule.

== Visual representations ==
Rather than using a high-quality 3D rendering a molecule, there are several simplified standard ways of representing the 3D positioning of atoms around a stereocenter. One common convention uses a bond drawn as a solid wedge to indicate that a bond that is projecting towards the viewer, a dashed or hashed bond to indicate that a bond is receding away from the viewer, and plain lines to represent bonds that are in the plane of the molecule itself.

A Fischer projection represents the four directions around a tetrahedral atom by drawing the bonds horizontally or vertically, with vertical meaning the bond recedes away from the viewer and horizontal meaning the bond projects towards the viewer.

== Thalidomide example ==
Enantiomers of thalidomide

Stereochemistry has important applications in the field of medicine, particularly pharmaceuticals. An often cited example of the importance of stereochemistry relates to the thalidomide disaster. Thalidomide is a pharmaceutical drug, first prepared in 1957 in Germany, prescribed for treating morning sickness in pregnant women. The drug was discovered to be teratogenic, causing serious genetic damage to early embryonic growth and development, leading to limb deformation in babies. Several proposed mechanisms of teratogenicity involve different biological functions for the (R)- and (S)-thalidomide enantiomers. In the human body, however, thalidomide undergoes racemization: even if only one of the two enantiomers is administered as a drug, the other enantiomer is produced as a result of metabolism. Accordingly, it is incorrect to state that one stereoisomer is safe while the other is teratogenic. Thalidomide is currently used for the treatment of other diseases, notably cancer and leprosy. Strict regulations and controls have been implemented to avoid its use by pregnant women and prevent developmental deformities. This disaster was a driving force behind requiring strict testing of drugs before making them available to the public.

In yet another example, the drug ibuprofen can exist as (R)- and (S)-isomers. Only the (S)-ibuprofen is active in reducing inflammation and pain.

== Diastereomers ==
Isomers are of two types: diastereomers (also called diastereoisomers) and enantiomers. Enantiomers are non-superimposable mirror images. Diastereomers are all other types of isomers.

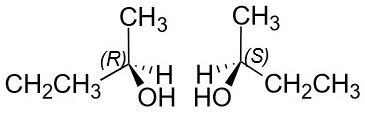
enantiomers of 2-butanol.

=== Epimers ===
Epimers are a subcategory of diastereomers that differ in absolute configuration configurations at only one corresponding stereocenter. They are commonly found in sugar chemistry, where two sugars can differ by the configuration of a single carbon atom. D-glucose and D-galactose are epimers, differing only at the C-4 position in their structure. (see sugar numbering)

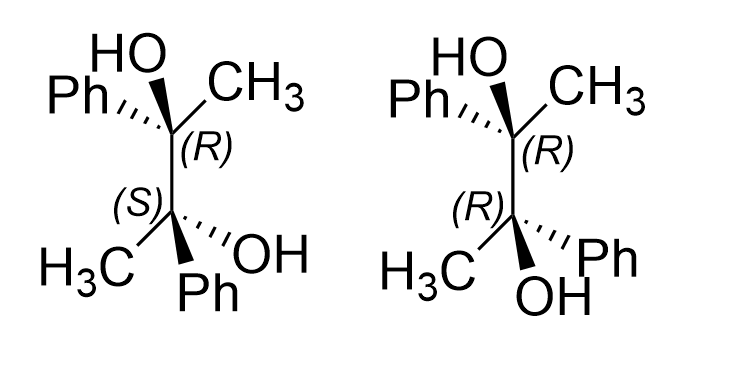
This pair can also be classified as epimers.

=== Cis–trans isomers ===
Cis–trans isomers are often associated alkene double bonds.

cis-pent-2-ene	trans-pent-2-ene

The more general E/Z nomenclature refers to the concept of cis/trans isomerism, and is especially useful for more complex compounds.

(Z)-1-Bromo-1,2-dichloroethene	(E)-1-Bromo-1,2-dichloroethene

=== Atropisomers ===
Atropisomerism are another kind of diasteromer. They exist because of the inability to rotate about a bond, such as due to steric hindrance between functional groups on two sp^{2}-hybridized carbon atoms. Usually atropisomers are chiral, and as such they are a form of axial chirality. Atropisomerism can be described as conformational isomerism

== History ==
In 1815, Jean-Baptiste Biot's observation of optical activity marked the beginning of organic stereochemistry history. He observed that organic molecules were able to rotate the plane of polarized light in a solution or in the gaseous phase. Despite Biot's discoveries, Louis Pasteur is commonly described as the first stereochemist, having observed in 1842 that salts of tartaric acid collected from wine production vessels could rotate the plane of polarized light, but that salts from other sources did not. This was the only physical property that differed between the two types of tartrate salts, which is due to optical isomerism. In 1874, Jacobus Henricus van 't Hoff and Joseph Le Bel explained optical activity in terms of the tetrahedral arrangement of the atoms bound to carbon. Kekulé explored tetrahedral models earlier, in 1862, but never published his work; Emanuele Paternò probably knew of these but was the first to draw and discuss three dimensional structures, such as of 1,2-dibromoethane in the Giornale di Scienze Naturali ed Economiche in 1869. The term "chiral" was introduced by Lord Kelvin in 1904. Arthur Robertson Cushny, a Scottish Pharmacologist, first provided a clear example in 1908 of a bioactivity difference between enantiomers of a chiral molecule viz. (−)-Adrenaline is two times more potent than the (±)- form as a vasoconstrictor and in 1926 laid the foundation for chiral pharmacology/stereo-pharmacology (biological relations of optically isomeric substances). Later in 1966, the Cahn–Ingold–Prelog nomenclature or Sequence rule was devised to assign absolute configuration to stereogenic/chiral center (R- and S- notation) and extended to be applied across olefinic bonds (E- and Z- notation).

== See also ==
- Alkane stereochemistry
- Chiral resolution, which often involves crystallization
- Chirality (chemistry) (R/S, d/l)
- Chiral switch
- Skeletal formula, which describes how stereochemistry is denoted in skeletal formulae.
- Solid-state chemistry
- VSEPR theory
- Nuclear Overhauser effect, a method in nuclear magnetic resonance spectroscopy (NMR) employed to elucidate the stereochemistry of organic molecules
