= BMS‐986122 =

Chemical compound

Clinical data
- Other names: BMS986122; BMS-122; BMS122
- Drug class: μ-Opioid receptor positive allosteric modulator (MOR PAM)
- ATC code: None

Identifiers
- IUPAC name: 2-(3-bromo-4-methoxyphenyl)-3-(4-chlorophenyl)sulfonyl-1,3-thiazolidine
- CAS Number: 313669-88-4
- PubChem CID: 4644453
- ChemSpider: 3834202

Chemical and physical data
- Formula: C_{16}H_{15}BrClNO_{3}S_{2}
- Molar mass: 448.77 g·mol^{−1}
- 3D model (JSmol): Interactive image
- SMILES: COC1=C(C=C(C=C1)C2N(CCS2)S(=O)(=O)C3=CC=C(C=C3)Cl)Br
- InChI: InChI=1S/C16H15BrClNO3S2/c1-22-15-7-2-11(10-14(15)17)16-19(8-9-23-16)24(20,21)13-5-3-12(18)4-6-13/h2-7,10,16H,8-9H2,1H3; Key:PNGJPVDGZNPZHY-UHFFFAOYSA-N

BMS‐986122 is a selective positive allosteric modulator (PAM) of the μ-opioid receptor (MOR).

MOR PAMs like BMS-986122 could be useful as novel analgesics with reduced side effects compared to conventional opioid analgesics. However, the potential specifically of BMS-986121 and BMS-986122 as pharmaceutical drugs may be restricted due to their complex synthesis.

== Pharmacology ==
=== Pharmacodynamics ===
BMS-986122 can enhance the affinity and efficacy of various orthosteric MOR agonists, including the endogenous opioid peptides, for the MOR. However, its effects are dependent on the ligand, and in the case of morphine, it enhances efficacy without affecting affinity. BMS‐986122 has no MOR agonist activity, is selective for the MOR, and lacks PAM activity at the δ-opioid receptor (DOR). However, it has been identified as a silent allosteric modulator (SAM) of the DOR and κ-opioid receptor (KOR).

The drug has analgesic effects in animals. In contrast to MOR agonists, BMS-986122 does not appear to promote opioid-induced constipation, respiratory depression, or reward. The drug has been found to attenuate opioid tolerance in rodents, specifically in terms of analgesia. Besides its analgesic effects, BMS-986122 has been found to enhance the analgesic effects of non-opioid analgesics such as clonidine and gabapentin in rodents.

== History ==
BMS-986122 was first described in 2013, and along with BMS-986121, was the first selective MOR PAM to be discovered. They were identified via high-throughput screening (HTS). Their characterization led to the discovery of a putative conserved allosteric site across the MOR and other opioid receptors.

== Related compounds ==
A dual DOR and κ-opioid receptor (KOR) PAM, BMS-986187, derived from BMS-986122, has been developed and is selective for these receptors over the MOR.

Another MOR PAM with a simpler synthesis, MS1, was subsequently developed and has shown similar effects to those of BMS-986122. Additionally, ignavine, a natural MOR PAM found in Aconitum, has also been identified.

In 2024, ketamine and its metabolites norketamine and hydroxynorketamine (HNK) were identified as highly potent MOR, DOR, and KOR PAMs (active at a concentration of as low as 1 nM). These actions were implicated in their potential antidepressant and analgesic effects.

== See also ==
- SR-17018
