= Norketamine =

Major active metabolite of ketamine

Clinical data
- ATC code: None

Legal status
- Legal status: CA: Schedule I; UK: Class B

Identifiers
- IUPAC name: 2-Amino-2-(2-chlorophenyl)cyclohexan-1-one
- CAS Number: 35211-10-0 79499-59-5 (HCl)
- PubChem CID: 123767
- ChemSpider: 110322
- UNII: XQY6JVF94X
- ChEBI: CHEBI:91519
- ChEMBL: ChEMBL1039
- CompTox Dashboard (EPA): DTXSID40891434

Chemical and physical data
- Formula: C_{12}H_{14}ClNO
- Molar mass: 223.70 g·mol^{−1}
- 3D model (JSmol): Interactive image
- SMILES: C1CCC(C(=O)C1)(C2=CC=CC=C2Cl)N
- InChI: InChI=1S/C12H14ClNO/c13-10-6-2-1-5-9(10)12(14)8-4-3-7-11(12)15/h1-2,5-6H,3-4,7-8,14H2; Key:BEQZHFIKTBVCAU-UHFFFAOYSA-N

Norketamine, or N-desmethylketamine, is the major active metabolite of ketamine, which is formed mainly by CYP3A4. Similarly to ketamine, norketamine acts as a noncompetitive NMDA receptor antagonist, but is about 3–5 times less potent as an anesthetic in comparison.

== Pharmacology ==
=== Pharmacodynamics ===
Similarly to ketamine, norketamine acts as a noncompetitive NMDA receptor antagonist (K_{i} = 1.7 μM and 13 μM for (S)-(+)-norketamine and (R)-(–)-norketamine, respectively). Also, similarly again to ketamine, norketamine binds to the μ- and κ-opioid receptors. Relative to ketamine, norketamine is much more potent as an antagonist of the α_{7}-nicotinic acetylcholine receptor, and produces rapid antidepressant effects in animal models which have been reported to correlate with its activity at this receptor. However, norketamine is about 1/5 as potent as ketamine as an antidepressant in mice as per the forced swim test, and this seems also to be in accordance with its 3–5-fold reduced comparative potency in vivo as an NMDA receptor antagonist. Norketamine's metabolites, dehydronorketamine (DHNK) and hydroxynorketamine (HNK), are far less or negligibly active as NMDA receptor antagonists in comparison, but retain activity as potent antagonists of the α_{7}-nicotinic acetylcholine receptor.

In 2024, norketamine was discovered to act as a highly potent positive allosteric modulator of the opioid receptors, including of the μ-opioid receptor (MOR). It shares this action with ketamine and hydroxynorketamine (HNK). They are all active in this action at very low concentrations, for instance 1 nM. Ketamine, norketamine, and HNK can potentiate the effects of endogenous opioids like met-enkephalin and exogenous opioids like morphine. Opioid receptor positive allosteric modulation by these agents may be involved in their therapeutic effects, for instance their antidepressant and analgesic effects.

=== Pharmacokinetics ===
Ketamine is effectively metabolized by the superfamily of cytochrome P450 enzymes, particularly CYP2B6 and CYP3A. Though these enzymes are predominantly found in the liver, they are present in many other organs and tissue groups throughout the body, localized to the endoplasmic reticulum of such cells. Peak concentration of norketamine occurs roughly 17 minutes after initially administering ketamine. The subsequent metabolism of norketamine to hydroxynorketamine and dehydronorketamine from ketamine occurs 2–3 hours after ketamine infusion, and occurs at a roughly 30:70 formation ratio. HNK is formed via the hydroxylation of the cyclohexone ring; these are then conjugated with glucoronic acid to form DHNK.

As with their precursors ketamine and norketamine, HNK and DHNK are of great interest to pharmacologists for their putative anti-depressant and analgesic properties.

== Chemistry ==
=== Synthesis ===
Stevens' original design utilized a continuous flow of bromine and ammonia, each highly toxic and corrosive reagents with considerable material compatibility issues.

== History ==
Norketamine was synthesized by Calvin Lee Stevens in the early 1960s, as part of his team's work on α-aminoketones at Wayne State University.

While most research has historically focused on its precursor, researchers have taken notice of norketamine's putative effects. Beginning in the late 1990s, Danish researchers discovered its role as a NMDA receptor antagonist. Later research uncovered its use as an antinociceptive, or "painkiller."

Following the 2019 approval of the ketamine enantiomer esketamine by the European Medicines Agency and FDA for use with treatment-resistant depression, researchers and pharmaceutical companies have sought other effective intermediates and metabolites of racemic ketamine.

Much of the research examining the potential role of norketamine as a distinct anti-depressant to its precursor began in the mid-2010s. Rodent models have showcased that norketamine crosses the blood-brain barrier, though considerably less efficiently than ketamine. Accordingly, its antidepressant effects are less potent than enantiomers of ketamine, but appear to be as effective as esketamine in its potency and duration. Unlike esketamine, (S)-norketamine does not appear to significantly impact prepulse inhibition (reduction of the startle reflex) and as such appears to have significantly fewer psychotomimetic effects - which may indicate that it could be a safer alternative to ketamine for use as an antidepressant in humans.
