= Dehydronorketamine =

Chemical compound

Clinical data
- ATC code: None

Identifiers
- IUPAC name: 6-Amino-6-(2-chlorophenyl)cyclohex-2-en-1-one
- CAS Number: 57683-62-2
- PubChem CID: 162835
- ChemSpider: 142954
- UNII: J5442FVV58
- CompTox Dashboard (EPA): DTXSID80973283

Chemical and physical data
- Formula: C_{12}H_{12}ClNO
- Molar mass: 221.68 g·mol^{−1}
- 3D model (JSmol): Interactive image
- SMILES: C1CC(C(=O)C=C1)(C2=CC=CC=C2Cl)N
- InChI: InChI=1S/C12H12ClNO/c13-10-6-2-1-5-9(10)12(14)8-4-3-7-11(12)15/h1-3,5-7H,4,8,14H2; Key:BXBPJMHHWPXBJL-UHFFFAOYSA-N

Dehydronorketamine (DHNK), or 5,6-dehydronorketamine, is a minor metabolite of ketamine which is formed by dehydrogenation of its metabolite norketamine. Though originally considered to be inactive, DHNK has been found to act as a potent and selective negative allosteric modulator of the α_{7}-nicotinic acetylcholine receptor (IC_{50} = 55 nM). For this reason, similarly to hydroxynorketamine (HNK), it has been hypothesized that DHNK may have the capacity to produce rapid antidepressant effects. However, unlike ketamine, norketamine, and HNK, DHNK has been found to be inactive in the forced swim test (FST) in mice at doses up to 50 mg/kg. DHNK is inactive at the α_{3}β_{4}-nicotinic acetylcholine receptor (IC_{50} > 100 μM) and is only very weakly active at the NMDA receptor (K_{i} = 38.95 μM for (S)-(+)-DHNK). It can be detected 7–10 days after a modest dose of ketamine, and because of this, is useful in drug detection assays.

== See also ==
- Arketamine
- Esketamine
