= Ignavine =

Diterpine alkaloid and opioid receptor modulator

Clinical data
- Other names: 3,9,15-Trihydroxyhetisan-2-yl benzoate
- Drug class: μ-Opioid receptor positive allosteric modulator or agonist; Analgesic

Identifiers
- IUPAC name: [(3R,4R,5R,11S,13R,16R,17R,18R)-4,13,18-trihydroxy-5-methyl-12-methylidene-7-azaheptacyclo[9.6.2.01,8.05,17.07,16.09,14.014,18]nonadecan-3-yl] benzoate
- CAS Number: 1357-76-2
- PubChem CID: 3035320
- ChemSpider: 2299598
- ChEBI: CHEBI:138829

Chemical and physical data
- Formula: C_{27}H_{31}NO_{5}
- Molar mass: 449.547 g·mol^{−1}
- 3D model (JSmol): Interactive image
- SMILES: C[C@]12CN3[C@H]4[C@H]1C5(C3C6C[C@H]7C[C@@]5(C6(C4)[C@@H](C7=C)O)O)C[C@H]([C@@H]2O)OC(=O)C8=CC=CC=C8
- InChI: InChI=1S/C27H31NO5/c1-13-15-8-16-20-26-11-18(33-23(31)14-6-4-3-5-7-14)22(30)24(2)12-28(20)17(19(24)26)10-25(16,21(13)29)27(26,32)9-15/h3-7,15-22,29-30,32H,1,8-12H2,2H3/t15-,16?,17+,18+,19+,20?,21+,22-,24-,25?,26?,27-/m0/s1; Key:FOIZZXKAYVIZQC-HBFXMWHYSA-N

Ignavine is a naturally occurring diterpene alkaloid found in Aconiti tuber. It has been reported to act as a μ-opioid receptor (MOR) positive allosteric modulator (PAM). The drug potentiated responses to the selective MOR agonist DAMGO at low concentrations but inhibited DAMGO at high concentrations. Ignavine alone has been found to produce analgesic effects in animals, but with a biphasic dose–response curve. Although described as a MOR PAM, other research suggests that ignavine is a ligand of the orthosteric site of the MOR and does not act as a PAM. Instead, it may be a MOR partial agonist. However, more research is necessary to clarify its MOR actions. Ignavine was first isolated by 1952, and its MOR PAM activity was first reported by 2016.

== See also ==
- BMS‐986122
- BMS-986187
