= Arketamine =

Chemical compound

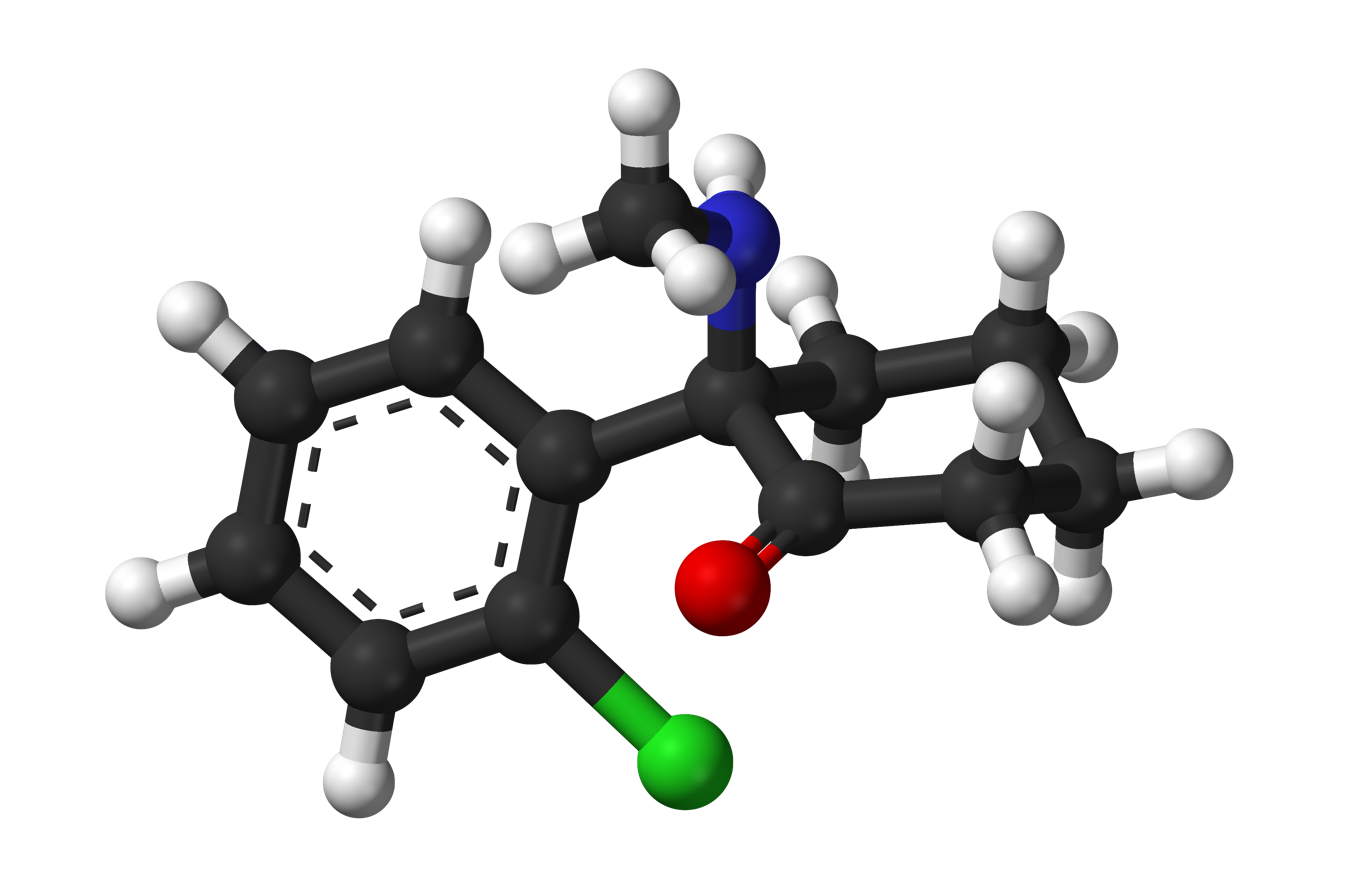

Clinical data
- Other names: PCN-101; HR-071603
- Addiction liability: Moderate
- ATC code: None

Legal status
- Legal status: AU: S8 (Controlled drug); CA: Schedule I; UK: Class B / Schedule 2; US: Schedule III; UN: Unscheduled

Identifiers
- IUPAC name: (R)-2-(2-Chlorophenyl)-2-(methylamino)cyclohexanone
- CAS Number: 33643-49-1
- PubChem CID: 644025
- ChemSpider: 559099
- UNII: Y2RI13H7VW
- CompTox Dashboard (EPA): DTXSID2048747

Chemical and physical data
- Formula: C_{13}H_{16}ClNO
- Molar mass: 237.73 g·mol^{−1}
- 3D model (JSmol): Interactive image
- SMILES: CN[C@]1(CCCCC1=O)C2=CC=CC=C2Cl
- InChI: InChI=1S/C13H16ClNO/c1-15-13(9-5-4-8-12(13)16)10-6-2-3-7-11(10)14/h2-3,6-7,15H,4-5,8-9H2,1H3/t13-/m1/s1; Key:YQEZLKZALYSWHR-CYBMUJFWSA-N

Arketamine (developmental code names PCN-101, HR-071603), also known as (R)-ketamine or (R)-(−)-ketamine, is the (R)-(−) enantiomer of ketamine. Similarly to racemic ketamine and esketamine, the (S)-(+) enantiomer of ketamine, arketamine is biologically active; however, it is less potent as an NMDA receptor antagonist and anesthetic and thus has never been approved or marketed for clinical use as an enantiopure drug. Arketamine is currently in clinical development as a novel antidepressant.

Relative to esketamine, arketamine possesses 4 to 5 times lower affinity for the PCP site of the NMDA receptor. In accordance, arketamine is significantly less potent than racemic ketamine and especially esketamine in terms of anesthetic, analgesic, and sedative-hypnotic effects. Racemic ketamine has weak affinity for the sigma receptor, where it acts as an agonist, whereas esketamine binds negligibly to this receptor, and so the sigma receptor activity of racemic ketamine lies in arketamine. It was suggested that this action of arketamine may play a role in the hallucinogenic effects of racemic ketamine and that it may be responsible for the lowering of the seizure threshold seen with racemic ketamine. However several subsequent studies have indicated that esketamine is more likely to induce dissociative events, while studies in patients undergoing electroconvulsive therapy suggested that esketamine is a potent inducer of seizures. Esketamine inhibits the dopamine transporter about 8-fold more potently than does arketamine, and so is about 8 times more potent as a dopamine reuptake inhibitor. Arketamine and esketamine possess similar potency for interaction with the muscarinic acetylcholine receptors.

== Novel antidepressant ==
Arketamine appears to be more effective as a rapid-acting antidepressant than esketamine in preclinical research.

In rodent studies, esketamine produced hyperlocomotion, prepulse inhibition deficits, and rewarding effects, while arketamine did not, in accordance with its lower potency as an NMDA receptor antagonist and dopamine reuptake inhibitor. As such, arketamine may have a lower propensity for producing psychotomimetic effects and a lower abuse potential in addition to superior antidepressant efficacy.

A study conducted in mice found that ketamine's antidepressant activity is not caused by ketamine inhibiting NMDAR, but rather by sustained activation of a different glutamate receptor, the AMPA receptor, by a metabolite, (2R,6R)-hydroxynorketamine; as of 2017 it was unknown if this was happening in humans. Arketamine is an AMPA receptor agonist.

Paradoxically, arketamine shows greater and longer-lasting rapid antidepressant effects in animal models of depression relative to esketamine. It has been suggested that this may be due to the possibility of different activities of arketamine and esketamine and their respective metabolites at the α_{7}-nicotinic receptor, as norketamine and hydroxynorketamine are potent antagonists of this receptor and markers of potential rapid antidepressant effects (specifically, increased mammalian target of rapamycin function) correlate closely with their affinity for it. The picture is unclear however, and other mechanisms have also been implicated.

== Clinical development ==
As of November 2019, arketamine is under development for the treatment of depression under the developmental code names PCN-101 by Perception Neuroscience in the United States and HR-071603 by Jiangsu Hengrui Medicine in China. Arketamine failed to show antidepressant effectiveness in a controlled phase 2a clinical trial.

== See also ==
- List of investigational antidepressants
