= A1APU =

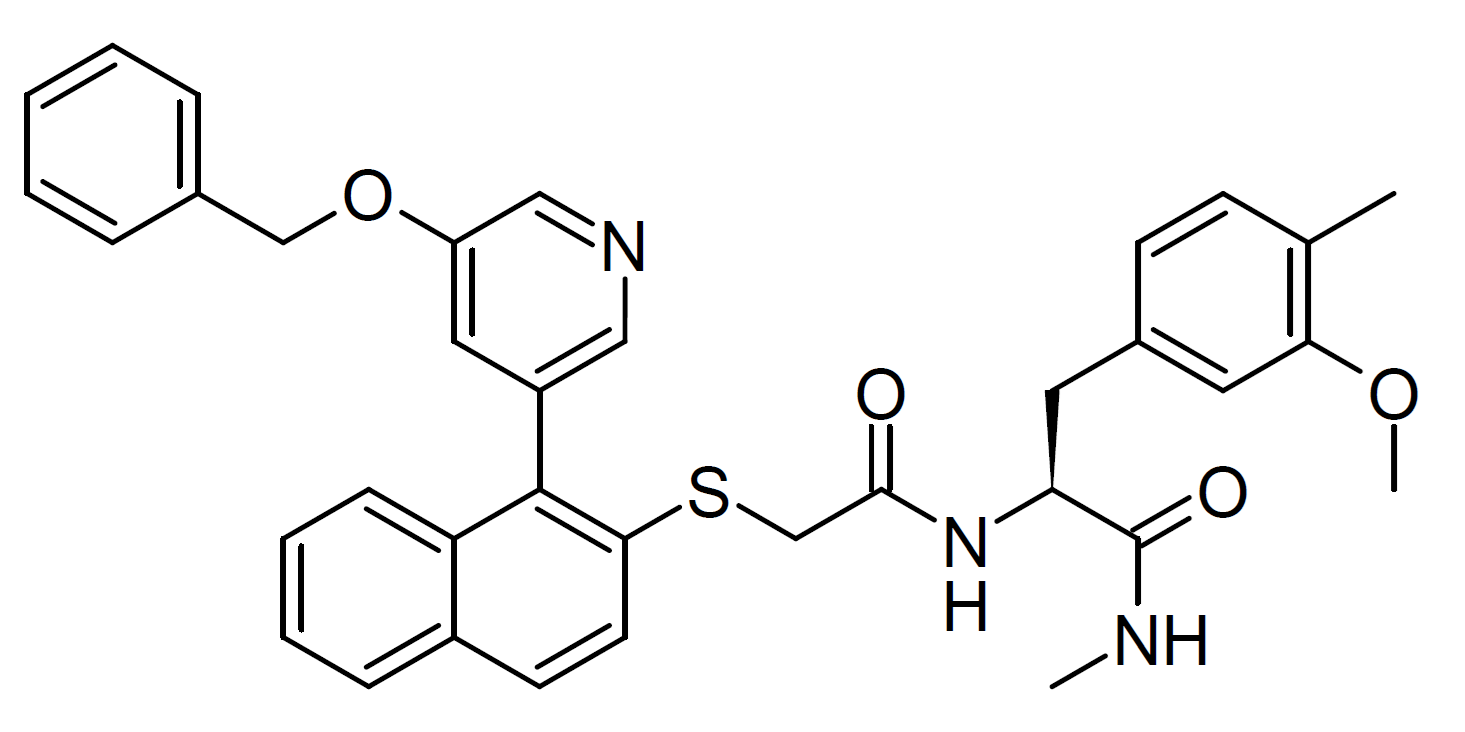

Identifiers
- IUPAC name: (2S)-3-(3-methoxy-4-methylphenyl)-N-methyl-2-[[2-[1-(5-phenylmethoxypyridin-3-yl)naphthalen-2-yl]sulfanylacetyl]amino]propanamide
- PubChem CID: 171642066
- ChemSpider: 129393366

Chemical and physical data
- Formula: C_{36}H_{35}N_{3}O_{4}S
- Molar mass: 605.75 g·mol^{−1}
- 3D model (JSmol): Interactive image
- SMILES: CC1=C(C=C(C=C1)C[C@@H](C(=O)NC)NC(=O)CSC2=C(C3=CC=CC=C3C=C2)C4=CC(=CN=C4)OCC5=CC=CC=C5)OC
- InChI: InChI=1S/C36H35N3O4S/c1-24-13-14-26(18-32(24)42-3)17-31(36(41)37-2)39-34(40)23-44-33-16-15-27-11-7-8-12-30(27)35(33)28-19-29(21-38-20-28)43-22-25-9-5-4-6-10-25/h4-16,18-21,31H,17,22-23H2,1-3H3,(H,37,41)(H,39,40)/t31-/m0/s1; Key:IBQRWMDLUKSOJL-HKBQPEDESA-N

A1APU (10105-368-30-605-0) is a negative allosteric modulator (NAM) of the μ-opioid receptor (MOR) which has been developed as a potential treatment for opioid overdose. In animal studies it increases the potency and effective duration of naloxone making it able to block opioid-induced respiratory depression at a tenth of the normal dose.

== See also ==
- MS1 (drug)
