= Hydroxynorketamine =

Chemical compound

- The four possible stereoisomers of Hydroxynorketamine

Clinical data
- Other names: HNK; 6-Hydroxynorketamine; 6-HNK
- ATC code: None

Identifiers
- IUPAC name: 2-Amino-2-(2-chlorophenyl)-6-hydroxycyclohexan-1-one
- CAS Number: 81395-70-2
- PubChem CID: 133669
- ChemSpider: 117907
- UNII: 6VAD9SC8NW
- CompTox Dashboard (EPA): DTXSID701001963

Chemical and physical data
- Formula: C_{12}H_{14}ClNO_{2}
- Molar mass: 239.70 g·mol^{−1}
- 3D model (JSmol): Interactive image
- SMILES: C1CC(C(=O)C(C1)(C2=CC=CC=C2Cl)N)O
- InChI: InChI=1S/C12H14ClNO2/c13-9-5-2-1-4-8(9)12(14)7-3-6-10(15)11(12)16/h1-2,4-5,10,15H,3,6-7,14H2; Key:CFBVGSWSOJBYGC-UHFFFAOYSA-N

Hydroxynorketamine (HNK), or 6-hydroxynorketamine, is a minor metabolite of the anesthetic, dissociative, and antidepressant drug ketamine. It is formed by hydroxylation of the intermediate norketamine, another metabolite of ketamine. As of late 2019, (2R,6R)-HNK is in clinical trials for the treatment of depression.

The major metabolite of ketamine is norketamine (80%). Norketamine is secondarily converted into 4-, 5-, and 6-hydroxynorketamines (15%), mainly HNK (6-hydroxynorketamine). Ketamine is also transformed into hydroxyketamine (5%). As such, bioactivated HNK comprises less than 15% of a dose of ketamine.

== Pharmacology ==
In contrast to ketamine and norketamine, HNK is inactive as an anesthetic and psychostimulant. In accordance, it has only very weak affinity for the NMDA receptor (K_{i} = 21.19 μM and > 100 μM for (2S,6S)-HNK and (2R,6R)-HNK, respectively). However, HNK does still show biological activity, having been found to act as a potent and selective negative allosteric modulator of the α_{7}-nicotinic acetylcholine receptor (IC_{50} < 1 μM). Moreover, (2S,6S)-HNK was tested and found to increase the function of the mammalian target of rapamycin (mTOR), a marker of the antidepressant activity of ketamine, far more potently than ketamine itself (0.05 nM for (2S,6S)-HNK, 10 nM for (S)-norketamine, and 1,000 nM for (S)-ketamine (esketamine), respectively), an action that was observed to correlate closely with their ability to inhibit the α_{7}-nicotinic acetylcholine receptor. This finding has led to a call of reassessment of the understanding of the rapid antidepressant effects of ketamine and their mechanisms. However, subsequent research has found that dehydronorketamine, which is a potent and selective antagonist of the α_{7}-nicotinic acetylcholine receptor similarly to HNK, is inactive in the forced swim test at doses up to 50 mg/kg in mice, and this is in contrast to ketamine and norketamine, which are effective at doses of 10 mg/kg and 50 mg/kg, respectively.

In May 2016, a study published in the journal Nature determined that HNK, specifically (2S,6S;2R,6R)-HNK, is responsible for the antidepressant-like effects of ketamine in mice; administration of (2R,6R)-HNK demonstrated ketamine-type antidepressant-like effects, and preventing the metabolic conversion of ketamine into HNK blocked the antidepressant-like effects of the parent compound. As (2R,6R)-HNK, unlike ketamine, does not antagonize the NMDA receptor to a clinically relevant degree, and produces no dissociative or euphoric effects, it has consequently been concluded that the antidepressant effects of ketamine may in fact not be mediated via the NMDA receptor. This is tentative, as confirmation that the findings translate to humans is still needed, but it is notable that published human data show a positive association between the antidepressant responses of ketamine and plasma (2S,6S;2R,6R)-HNK levels. In accordance with the notion that the NMDA receptor is not responsible for the antidepressant effects of ketamine, dizocilpine (MK-801), which binds to and blocks the same site on the NMDA receptor that ketamine does, lacks antidepressant-like effects. Moreover, the findings would explain why other NMDA receptor antagonists such as memantine, lanicemine, and traxoprodil have thus far failed to demonstrate ketamine-like antidepressant effects in human clinical trials. Instead of acting via blockade of the NMDA receptor, (2R,6R)-HNK increases activation of the AMPA receptor via a currently unknown/uncertain mechanism. The compound is now under active investigation by researchers at NIMH for potential clinical use, and it is hoped that use of HNK instead will mitigate the various concerns (such as abuse and dissociation) of using ketamine itself in the treatment of depression.

Ketamine and metabolites at the NMDAR
| Compound | IC_{50} (μM) | K_{i} (μM) | % inhibition at 100 μM |
|---|---|---|---|
| (+)-MK-801 | 0.00493 | 0.00348 | 100 |
| (R,S)-Ketamine | 0.35 | 0.25 | 91 |
| (R)-Norketamine | 0.85 | 0.6 | 90 |
| (S)-Norketamine | 1.23 | 0.87 | 99 |
| (R)-DHNK | 59.7 | 42.1 | 68 |
| (S)-DHNK | 42 | 29.7 | 66 |
| (2R,6R)-HNK | >100 | >100 | 24 |
| (2S,6S)-HNK | 10.4 | 7.34 | 85 |
| (2R,6S)-HNK | >100 | >100 | 8 |
| (2S,6R)-HNK | >100 | >100 | 24 |
| (2R,5R)-HNK | >100 | >100 | 12 |
| (2S,5S)-HNK | >100 | >100 | 27 |
| (2R,5S)-HNK | >100 | >100 | 10 |
| (2S,5R)-HNK | >100 | >100 | 35 |
| (2R,4S)-HNK | >100 | >100 | 23 |
| (2S,4R)-HNK | >100 | >100 | 34 |
| (2R,4R)-HNK | >100 | >100 | 3 |
| (2S,4S)-HNK | >100 | >100 | 11 |

However, a June 2017 study found that (2R,6R)-HNK does in fact block the NMDA receptor, similarly to ketamine. These findings suggest that the antidepressant-like effects of (2R,6R)-HNK may not actually be NMDA receptor-independent and that it may act in a similar manner to ketamine.

Ketamine, (2R,6R)-HNK, and (2S,6S)-HNK have been found to be possible ligands of the estrogen receptor ERα (IC_{50} = 2.31, 3.40, and 3.53 μM, respectively).

In 2024, HNK was found to act as a highly potent positive allosteric modulator of the opioid receptors, including of the μ-opioid receptor (MOR). It shares this action with ketamine and norketamine. They are all active in this action at very low concentrations, for instance 1 nM. Ketamine, norketamine, and HNK can potentiate the effects of endogenous opioids like met-enkephalin and exogenous opioids like morphine. Opioid receptor positive allosteric modulation by these agents may be involved in their therapeutic effects, for instance their antidepressant and analgesic effects.

== Research ==
(2R,6R)-HNK is under development by the National Institute of Mental Health (NIMH) in the United States for the treatment of depression. As of late 2019, it is in phase I clinical trials for this indication. It is also under development under the developmental code name SPL-801-B by Cybin for depressive disorders.

== See also ==
- Arketamine
- List of investigational antidepressants
- List of investigational hallucinogens and entactogens
