= Treatment-resistant depression =

- Other names: Treatment-refractory depression
- Specialty: Psychiatry
- Symptoms: Depressive mood, anhedonia, low energy
- Complications: Self-harm, suicide

Treatment-resistant depression (TRD) is often defined as major depressive disorder in which an affected person does not respond adequately to at least two different antidepressant medications at an adequate dose and for an adequate duration. Electroconvulsive therapy, ketamine and esketamine, rTMS, and certain adjunctive agents are effective.

Inadequate response has most commonly been defined as less than 25% reduction in depressive symptoms following treatment with an antidepressant. Many clinicians and researchers question the construct validity and clinical utility of treatment-resistant depression as currently conceptualized. There is ongoing debate as to whether inadequate response to other treatment modalities, such as psychotherapy, should be included in defining TRD.

Treatment resistance is becoming more prominent with nearly 30% of individuals with major depressive disorder being termed treatment-resistant as defined above. There are many factors that may contribute to inadequate treatment, such as: a history of repeated or severe adverse childhood experiences, early discontinuation of treatment, failure to consider psychotherapy and other psychosocial interventions, patient noncompliance, misdiagnosis, cognitive impairment, low income and other social determinants, and concurrent medical conditions, including comorbid psychiatric disorders. Cases of treatment-resistant depression may also be referred to by which medications people are resistant to (e.g., SSRI-resistant). They may also be staged based on how many treatments they have tried. Despite being called treatment-resistant, there are many treatment options available which are described in the treatment section below.

== Risk factors ==
=== Comorbid psychiatric disorders ===
Comorbid psychiatric disorders commonly go undetected in the treatment of depression. If left untreated, the symptoms of these disorders can interfere with both evaluation and treatment. Anxiety disorders are one of the most common disorder types associated with treatment-resistant depression. The two disorders commonly co-exist, and have some similar symptoms. Some studies have shown that patients with both major depressive disorder and panic disorder are the most likely to be nonresponsive to treatment. Substance abuse may also be a predictor of treatment-resistant depression. It may cause depressed patients to be noncompliant in their treatment, and the effects of certain substances can worsen the effects of depression. Other psychiatric disorders that may predict treatment-resistant depression include attention deficit hyperactivity disorder, personality disorders, obsessive compulsive disorder, and eating disorders.

=== Comorbid medical disorders ===
Some people who are diagnosed with treatment-resistant depression may have an underlying undiagnosed health condition that is causing or contributing to their depression. Endocrine disorders like hypothyroidism, Cushing's disease, and Addison's disease are among the most commonly identified as contributing to depression. Others include diabetes, coronary artery disease, cancer, HIV, and Parkinson's disease. Another factor is that medications used to treat comorbid medical disorders may lessen the effectiveness of antidepressants or cause depression symptoms.

=== Features of depression ===
People with depression who also display psychotic symptoms such as delusions or hallucinations are more likely to be treatment resistant. Another depressive feature that has been associated with poor response to treatment is longer duration of depressive episodes. Individuals with depression who struggle with insomnia or develop depression at a younger age are also more likely to be resistant to treatment. Finally, people with more severe depression and those who are suicidal are more likely to be nonresponsive to antidepressant treatment.

=== Demographic ===
Multiple populations have been identified as being more at risk for treatment resistance. Individuals who are not married or identify as single are one of these groups that may be more at risk. Another population who seems to have poor response to treatment are individuals who are unemployed. Finally, while both male and female gender have been identified as risk factors, it appears that females are more prone to struggle with resistance to treatment.

== Treatment ==
TRD is best supported by evidence for electroconvulsive therapy, ketamine (including esketamine), and certain neuromodulation approaches (e.g., rTMS/TBS), with some adjunctive agents showing benefit.

=== Medication ===
==== Antidepressants ====
===== Dose increase =====
Increasing the dosage of an antidepressant is a common strategy to treat depression that does not respond after adequate treatment duration. Practitioners who use this strategy will usually increase the dose until the person reports intolerable side effects, symptoms are eliminated, or the dose is increased to the limit of what is considered safe.

===== Switching or combining antidepressants =====
Studies have shown a wide variability in the effectiveness of switching antidepressants, with anywhere from 25 to 70% of people responding to a different antidepressant. There is support for the effectiveness of switching people to a different SSRI; 50% of people that were non-responsive after taking one SSRI were responsive after taking a second type. Switching people with treatment-resistant depression to a different class of antidepressants may also be effective. People who are non-responsive after taking an SSRI may respond to moclobemide or tricyclic antidepressants, bupropion or an MAOI.

Ketamine has been tested as a rapid-acting antidepressant for treatment-resistant depression in bipolar disorder, and major depressive disorder. Spravato, a nasal spray form of esketamine, was approved by the FDA in 2019 for use in treatment-resistant depression when combined with an oral antidepressant. One promising finding regarding ketamine has been a reduced suicide rate in patients struggling with treatment resistance. Spravato is still quite limited in its availability. Patients must be over 18 and be a part of the Risk Evaluation and Mitigation Strategies program. Additionally, esketamine can not be administered for at-home use and the treatment is very costly, though insurance could cover the costs. While ketamine does appear to have some effectiveness in treating treatment-resistant depression, there seems to be significant variability in its effect.

Psilocybin is approved by the Therapeutic Goods Administration (TGA) for treatment of treatment-resistant depression in Australia as of 2023.

Some low to moderate quality evidence points to success in the short term (8–12 weeks) using mianserin to augment antidepressant medications. Simply switching to mianserin might also produce an improvement, but the effect size is smaller. No data on quality of life is reported. Data derived from a single study meeting Cochrane 2019 inclusion criteria. The antidepressant mirtazapine has also been used for augmentation. One study on this practice was included in the Cochrane 2019 meta-analysis. The study found that mirtazapine augmentation is not superior to placebo augmentation.

==== Stimulants, or dopaminergic and/or norepinephrinergic agents ====
Stimulants are a class of medications that are most commonly used to treat inattention disorders such as ADHD, but they have also been used to treat patients with depression struggling with treatment resistance. Some of the stimulants that have been studied in treatment-resistant depression include methylphenidate, lisdexamfetamine, modafanil, and atomoxetine. When used, these medications are commonly used to augment traditional antidepressants and while there seems to be a wide range of effects, they do appear to have some benefit, especially in patients struggling with low energy, poor motivation and inattention as a result of their depression.

While these medications can be useful, there are some general contraindications to be mindful of. First, these medications are usually avoided in patients with a history of substance abuse due to their abuse potential. However, both modafinil and atomoxetine can be considered in this population due to their lower abuse potential. In addition, stimulants are generally avoided in patients with heart problems and severe hypertension. Other important considerations include history of psychosis as well as anxiety, as both of these may be worsened while taking stimulants.

==== Other medications ====
Medications that have been shown to be effective in people with treatment-resistant depression include lithium, liothyronine, benzodiazepines, atypical antipsychotics, and stimulants.

Adding lithium may be effective for people taking some types of antidepressants including SSRIs or SNRIs. Lithium augmentation in treatment-resistant depression reduces the odds of remaining ill by 56-95%. Augmenting an antidepressant with lithium is proven to improve major depressive disorder in multiple randomized controlled trials. Lithium augmentation therapy was associated with a 41.2% remission rate of unipolar depression compared to 14.4% with placebo. Lithium dramatically decreases the risk of suicide in recurrent major depression by 88.5%. In addition to reducing suicide, lithium also decreases all-cause mortality in people with mood disorders. A disadvantage of lithium is the need for occasional blood tests to check lithium levels.

Liothyronine (synthetic T_{3}) is a type of thyroid hormone and has been associated with improvement in mood and depression symptoms. Benzodiazepines may improve treatment-resistant depression by decreasing the adverse side effects caused by some antidepressants and therefore increasing patient compliance.

Atypical antipsychotics such as aripiprazole, quetiapine or olanzapine can be added to anti-depressants as part of augmentation of treatment. Eli Lilly, the company that sells both olanzapine and fluoxetine individually, has also released a combination formulation which contains olanzapine and fluoxetine in a single capsule. Some low to moderate quality evidence (7 studies meeting Cochrane 2019 inclusion criteria) point to success in the short term (8–12 weeks) using antipsychotics cariprazine, olanzapine, quetiapine or ziprasidone to augment antidepressant medications. These have shown promise in treating refractory depression but come with more serious side effects. Among studies meeting the Cochrane 2019 inclusion criteria, two report that quetiapine augmentation does not improve overall quality of life.

One study on the 5-HT_{1A} receptor partial agonist buspirone met the Cochrane 2019 inclusion criteria. It reported that buspirone augmentation did not provide an improvement over placebo augmentation. Ultimately, there are many medications that have been tried in treatment-resistant depression with varying effects.

=== Physical psychiatric treatments ===
==== Electroconvulsive therapy ====
Electroconvulsive therapy (ECT) is generally only considered as a treatment option in severe cases of treatment-resistant depression. It is used when medication has repeatedly failed to improve symptoms, and usually when the patient's symptoms are so severe that they have been hospitalized. It involves inducing a controlled seizure in a patient for a short time (30–90 seconds). Often patients receive a total of 6-12 sessions over the course of multiple weeks (receiving 2-3 sessions per week).

Electroconvulsive therapy has been found to reduce thoughts of suicide and relieve depressive symptoms. It has also been used to treat patients suffering from mania, psychosis, catatonia, and more. While the exact mechanism by which ECT treats depression is unknown, we know that many aspects of the brain's chemical structure and function are altered during seizure activity. This includes alterations of important neurotransmitters such as serotonin, norepinephrine, and dopamine. It is also associated with an increase in glial cell line derived neurotrophic factor.

When considering ECT, it is important to take into account the potential side effects. Most commonly, patients report cognitive impairments including difficulty with short-term and autobiographical memory as well as attention and learning. While these side effects can be distressing, they are often short-term and resolve within a few days with many patients seeing an overall improvement in cognitive function, including memory, following completion of treatment.

==== rTMS ====
rTMS (repetitive transcranial magnetic stimulation) is gradually becoming recognised as a valuable therapeutic option in treatment-resistant depression. It involves placing an electromagnetic coil near the head and stimulating the nerves in the areas of the brain that play a role in mood regulation and depression. A number of randomised placebo-controlled trials have compared real versus sham rTMS. These trials have consistently demonstrated the efficacy of this treatment against major depression. There have also been a number of meta-analyses of RCTs confirming the efficacy of rTMS in treatment-resistant major depression, as well as naturalistic studies showing its effectiveness in "real world" clinical settings. While effective, it is also generally tolerated well with very few side effects. A large retrospective chart review of 495 patients conducted in a naturalistic clinic setting found that rTMS was effective across all age groups (15–78), with no significant differences in treatment response or remission rates by age. This suggests that advanced age should not be considered a barrier to rTMS efficacy in treatment-resistant depression. Although rTMS holds promise as an alternative antidepressant treatment in adolescents, more robust evidence is needed to fully establish its role in the treatment arsenal.

==== dTMS ====
dTMS (deep transcranial magnetic stimulation) is a continuation of the same idea as rTMS, but with the hope that deeper stimulation of subcortical areas of the brain leads to increased effect. A 2015 systematic review and health technology assessment found lacking evidence in order to recommend the method over either ECT or rTMS because so few studies had been published.

==== Vagus nerve stimulation ====
Vagus nerve stimulation has also been used for treatment-resistant depression. While more studies are needed to better understand its effect, a meta analysis found evidence that it may provide some benefit to individuals struggling with treatment-resistance.

==== Deep brain stimulation ====
Deep brain stimulation has been used in a small number of clinical trials to treat people with severe treatment-resistant depression.

==== Magnetic seizure therapy ====
Magnetic seizure therapy is currently being investigated for treating refractory depression.

==== Transcranial direct-current stimulation ====
Transcranial direct-current stimulation is a form of neuromodulation that uses constant, low direct current delivered via electrodes on the head.

=== Psychotherapy ===
There is sparse evidence on the effectiveness of psychotherapy in cases of treatment-resistant depression. However, a review of the literature suggests that it may be an effective treatment option. Psychotherapy may be effective in people with treatment-resistant depression because it can help relieve stress that may contribute to depressive symptoms.

A Cochrane systematic review has shown that psychological therapies (including cognitive behavioural therapy, dialectical behavior therapy, interpersonal therapy and intensive short-term dynamic psychotherapy) added to usual care (with antidepressants) can be beneficial for depressive symptoms and for response and remission rates over the short term (up to six months) for patients with treatment-resistant depression. Medium- (7–12 months) and long‐term (longer than 12 months) effects seem similarly beneficial. Psychological therapies, including cognitive behavioral therapy, added to usual care (antidepressants) seem as acceptable as usual care alone and may be used as a first line treatment for mild to moderate treatment resistant depression. These findings were echoed by another systematic review finding improved response and remission rates for CBT over the short, medium, and long-term.

Recent meta-analyses suggest that mindfulness and mindfulness-based interventions, which emphasize attention to present-moment experience and reduced engagement with rumination, may be effective in addressing treatment-resistant depression.

== Outcomes ==
Treatment-resistant depression is associated with more instances of relapse than depression that is responsive to treatment. One study showed that as many as 80% of people with treatment-resistant depression who needed more than one course of treatment relapsed within a year. Treatment-resistant depression has also been associated with lower long-term quality of life. Individuals struggling with treatment-resistant depression report lower work productivity, higher rates of unemployment, and difficulty completing daily tasks when compared to the general population.

While treatment resistance is defined as failing to respond to at least two antidepressants, it has been shown that additional medication trials increase the likelihood of resistance and, as a result, depression recurrence. This is evidenced by a study that saw only 8 out of 124 patients in remission after two years of standard depression treatment. This often leads to significant hardships for individuals struggling with treatment resistance. However, additional studies and systematic literature reviews have noted that TRD symptoms have been seen to improve when monitored for periods longer than two years.

== Research ==
In 2018, the United States Food and Drug Administration (FDA) granted breakthrough therapy designation for psilocybin-assisted therapy for treatment-resistant depression. A systematic review published in 2021 found that the use of psilocybin as a pharmaceutical substance was associated with reduced intensity of depression symptoms.
