= MS1 (drug) =

Experimental drug

Clinical data
- Drug class: μ-Opioid receptor positive allosteric modulator

Identifiers
- IUPAC name: 2-[benzyl-(4-bromophenyl)sulfonylamino]-N-(3-chloro-4-methoxyphenyl)acetamide
- CAS Number: 358344-33-9
- PubChem CID: 1362709
- ChemSpider: 1140853

Chemical and physical data
- Formula: C_{22}H_{20}BrClN_{2}O_{4}S
- Molar mass: 523.83 g·mol^{−1}
- 3D model (JSmol): Interactive image
- SMILES: COC1=C(C=C(C=C1)NC(=O)CN(CC2=CC=CC=C2)S(=O)(=O)C3=CC=C(C=C3)Br)Cl
- InChI: InChI=1S/C22H20BrClN2O4S/c1-30-21-12-9-18(13-20(21)24)25-22(27)15-26(14-16-5-3-2-4-6-16)31(28,29)19-10-7-17(23)8-11-19/h2-13H,14-15H2,1H3,(H,25,27); Key:XILIAVXVRWSRNU-UHFFFAOYSA-N

MS1 is a positive allosteric modulator (PAM) of the μ-opioid receptor (MOR). It was developed from structural modification of the earlier MOR PAM BMS‐986122.

The drug has been found to augment the affinity of the MOR agonist levomethadone ((R)-methadone) for the MOR by 7-fold in vitro and to potentiate activation of the MOR by levomethadone by 4-fold in a G protein assay. However, MS1 displays strong probe dependence, and while it potentiates the MOR agonists levomethadone and morphine, it had no effect on the affinity or potency of the MOR agonists DAMGO or endomorphin-1. MS1 shows a preference for β-arrestin recruitment over G protein activation with endomorphin-1 exposure. The drug's actions are reportedly similar to those of BMS-986122, though its unclear if their mechanisms of action are the same. MS1 shows potentiated analgesic effects with opioids in animals. It also did not worsen opioid withdrawal symptoms, respiratory depression, or analgesic tolerance.

MS1 and other atypical MOR activators are of potential interest in the development of novel opioid analgesics with reduced adverse effects and misuse potential. MS1 has notably been found to penetrate the blood–brain barrier in animals. The potential of the related MOR PAMs BMS-986121 and BMS-986122 as pharmaceutical drugs has been restricted owing to their complex chemical synthesis. MS1 has a much simpler synthesis in comparison and hence has been regarded as having overcome this limitation.

MS1 was first described in the scientific literature by 2015. Additional MOR PAMs related to MS1, such as Comp5, have been developed.

== See also ==
- A1APU
