= Ketamine =

Dissociative anesthetic and anti-depressant

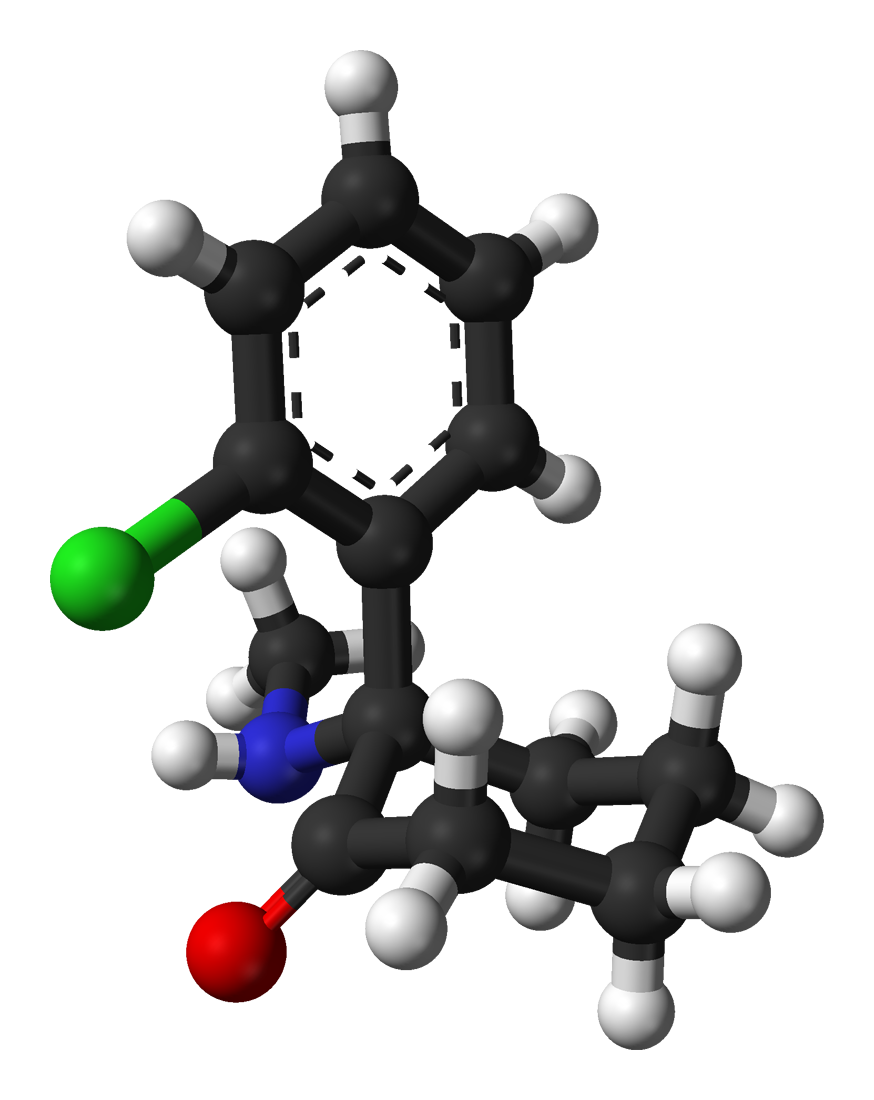

Clinical data
- Trade names: Ketalar, others
- Other names: 2-Cl-2'-oxo-PCM; CI-581; CL-369; CM-52372-2
- AHFS/Drugs.com: Monograph
- License data: US DailyMed: Ketamine
- Pregnancy category: AU: B3
- Addiction liability: Moderate–high
- Routes of administration: Any
- Drug class: NMDA receptor antagonist; general anesthetic; dissociative hallucinogen; analgesic; antidepressant
- ATC code: N01AX03 (WHO)

Legal status
- Legal status: AU: S8 (Controlled drug); BR: Class C1 (Other controlled substances); CA: Schedule I; DE: § 48 AMG/§ 1 MPAV (Prescription only); UK: Class B (Class A if prepared as an injection); US: Schedule III; UN: Unscheduled (Rx only); IN: Schedule X SE: Förteckning IV

Pharmacokinetic data
- Bioavailability: Intravenous: 100%; Intramuscular: 93%; Epidural: 77%; Intranasal: 45–50%; Sublingual: 24–30%; Rectal: 25–30%; By mouth: 16–20%
- Protein binding: 23–47%
- Metabolism: Liver, intestine (oral): Major: CYP3A4, CYP2B6
- Metabolites: Norketamine; Dehydronorketamine; Hydroxynorketamine
- Onset of action: Intravenous: seconds; Intramuscular: 1–5 min; Subcutaneous: 15–30 min; Insufflation: 5–10 min; By mouth: 15–30 min
- Elimination half-life: Ketamine: 2.5–3 hours; Norketamine: 12 hours
- Duration of action: Intramuscular: 0.5–2 hours; Insufflation: 45–60 min; By mouth: 1–6+ hours
- Excretion: Urine: 91%; Feces: 3%

Identifiers
- IUPAC name: (RS)-2-(2-Chlorophenyl)-2-(methylamino)cyclohexanone
- CAS Number: 6740-88-1; 33643-46-8 (esketamine); 33643-49-1 (arketamine); HCl: 1867-66-9
- PubChem CID: 3821
- IUPHAR/BPS: 4233
- DrugBank: DB01221
- ChemSpider: 3689
- UNII: 690G0D6V8H
- KEGG: D08098; HCl: D00711
- ChEBI: CHEBI:6121
- ChEMBL: ChEMBL742
- CompTox Dashboard (EPA): DTXSID8023187
- ECHA InfoCard: 100.027.095

Chemical and physical data
- Formula: C_{13}H_{16}ClNO
- Molar mass: 237.73 g·mol^{−1}
- 3D model (JSmol): Interactive image
- Chirality: Racemic mixture: Esketamine (S(+)-isomer); Arketamine (R(−)-isomer)
- Melting point: 92 °C (198 °F)
- SMILES: Clc1ccccc1C2(NC)CCCCC2=O
- InChI: InChI=1S/C13H16ClNO/c1-15-13(9-5-4-8-12(13)16)10-6-2-3-7-11(10)14/h2-3,6-7,15H,4-5,8-9H2,1H3; Key:YQEZLKZALYSWHR-UHFFFAOYSA-N

Ketamine is a cyclohexanone-derived dissociative general anesthetic and NMDA receptor antagonist with analgesic and hallucinogenic properties, used medically for anesthesia, depression, and pain management. Ketamine exists as its two enantiomers, S- (esketamine) and R- (arketamine).

At anesthetic doses, ketamine induces a state of dissociative anesthesia, a trance-like state providing pain relief, sedation, and amnesia. Its distinguishing features as an anesthetic are preserved breathing and airway reflexes, stimulated heart function with increased blood pressure, and moderate bronchodilation. As an anesthetic, it is used especially in trauma, emergency, and pediatric cases. At lower, sub-anesthetic doses, it is used as a treatment for pain and treatment-resistant depression.

Ketamine is legally used in medicine but is also tightly controlled, as it is used as a recreational drug for its hallucinogenic and dissociative effects. The long-term effects of repeated use are largely unknown and are an area of active investigation. Ketamine can cause dissociation and nausea, and other adverse effects, and is contraindicated in severe heart or liver disease, and uncontrolled psychosis.

Ketamine was first synthesized in 1962; it was derived from phencyclidine in pursuit of a safer anesthetic with fewer hallucinogenic effects. It was approved for use in the United States in 1970. It has been regularly used in veterinary medicine and was extensively used for surgical anesthesia in the Vietnam War. It later gained prominence for its rapid antidepressant effects discovered in 2000, marking a major breakthrough in depression treatment. Research on ketamine's effects and medical practices is still ongoing today.

== Medical uses ==
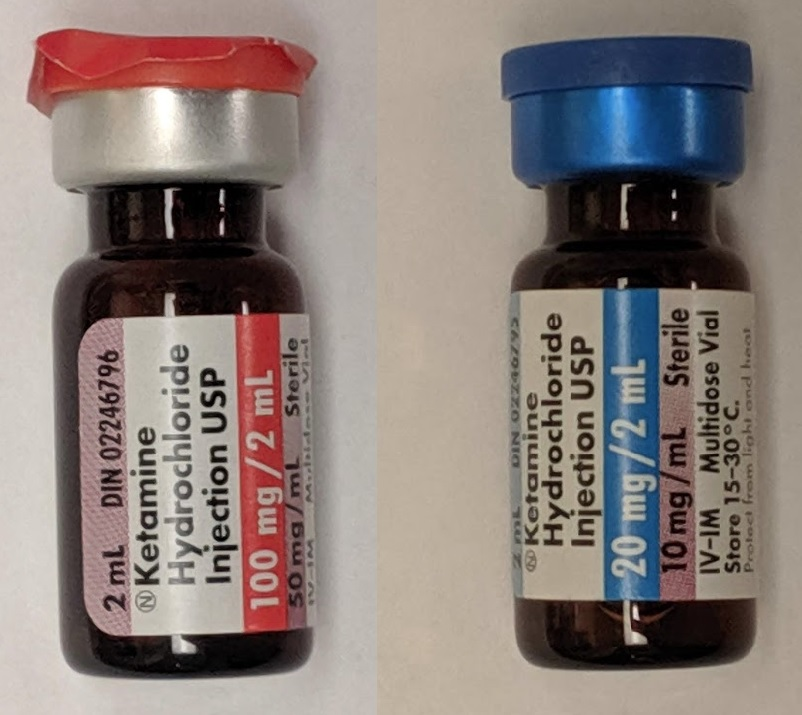
Two-dose vials of injectable ketamine, 50mg/ml and 10mg/ml

Ketamine is known for its medical purposes. Most commonly, it is used as general anesthetic that preserves airway and breathing reflexes while still producing a sedative effect. In lower doses, ketamine can be used for pain-management and as treatment for treatment-resistant depression.

=== Anesthesia ===
The use of ketamine in anesthesia reflects its characteristics. It is a drug of choice for short-term procedures when muscle relaxation is not required. The effect of ketamine on the respiratory and circulatory systems is different from that of other anesthetics. Compared to other anesthetics, ketamine is different because it does not suppress breathing as significantly as comparators. When used at anesthetic doses, ketamine usually stimulates rather than depresses the circulatory system. Protective airway reflexes are preserved, and it is possible to administer ketamine anesthesia without needing protective measures to the airways, such as an endotracheal tube or other ventilation mechanisms. Psychotomimetic effects limit the acceptance of ketamine by the brain and the body; however, lamotrigine and nimodipine decrease psychotomimetic effects and can also be counteracted by benzodiazepines or propofol administration. Ketofol is a combination of ketamine and propofol -- while the combined drug is not necessarily safer than each independent drug, the combination does minimize the side effects of each independent drug.

Ketamine is frequently used for severely injured people and appears to be safe for patients within this group. In war zones and field conditions, the drug has been widely used for emergency surgery, with the Vietnam War being a clear example. A 2011 clinical practice guideline supported the use of ketamine as a sedative in emergency medicine, including during physically painful procedures. Ketamine often raises blood pressure upon administration and is unlikely to lower blood pressure in most patients, making it useful in treating severe head injuries for which low blood pressure can be dangerous. As such, it is the drug of choice for people in traumatic shock who are at risk of hypotension.

For children, ketamine is a viable anesthetic option when it is the only anesthetic best fit for the case of a minor procedure, or as an induction agent followed by neuromuscular blockers and tracheal incubation. In particular, children with cyanotic heart disease and neuromuscular disorders are good candidates for ketamine anesthesia.

Due to the bronchodilating properties of ketamine, it can be used for anesthesia in people with asthma, chronic obstructive pulmonary disease, and with severe reactive airway disease, including active bronchospasm.

=== Pain ===
Ketamine can be used in multiple ways for pain management. In emergency departments, ketamine infusions are used for acute pain treatment, and in the perioperative period for individuals with refractory or intractable pain. The doses for pain management are lower than those used for anesthesia, usually referred to as sub-anesthetic doses. Adjunctive to morphine or on its own, ketamine reduces morphine use, pain level, nausea, and vomiting after surgery. Ketamine is most beneficial for surgical patients when severe post-operative pain is expected, and for opioid-tolerant patients.

Ketamine is especially useful in pre-hospital settings due to its effectiveness and low risk of respiratory depression. Ketamine has an efficacy similar to opioids when used in the hospital emergency department to target acute pain and procedural pain. Utilizing ketamine as the drug of choice for pain may also prevent opioid-induced hyperalgesia and postanesthetic shivering for patients.

For chronic pain, ketamine is used as an intravenous analgesic, especially if the pain is considered neuropathic. One of its added benefits is how it counteracts spinal sensitization or wind-up phenomena experienced with chronic pain. In multiple clinical trials, ketamine infusions delivered short-term pain relief in neuropathic pain diagnoses, pain after a traumatic spine injury, fibromyalgia, and complex regional pain syndrome (CRPS). However, the 2018 consensus guidelines on chronic pain concluded that, overall, there is weak evidence in favor of ketamine use for spinal injury pain, moderate evidence in favor of ketamine for CRPS, and weak or no evidence for ketamine for mixed neuropathic pain, fibromyalgia, and cancer pain. For CRPS in particular, there is evidence of medium to longer-term pain relief.

=== Depression ===
An enantiomer of ketamine – esketamine – was approved as an antidepressant by the European Medicines Agency in 2019. Also in 2019, esketamine was approved as a nasal spray for treatment-resistant depression in the United States and other countries. The Canadian Network for Mood and Anxiety Treatments (CANMAT) recommends esketamine as a third-line treatment for depression.

Ketamine maintenance therapy appears to be effective and generally safe for treatment-resistant depression, as long as it is prescribed with regular dosing, early intervention, and concurrent psychotherapy treatments to improve outcomes; in this process, standardized protocols and patient selection are crucial and still needs to be tested in clinical trials.

Most systematic reviews suggest that ketamine shows short-term efficacy in reducing suicidality with generally mild side effects, but the evidence is largely low quality and its long-term efficacy remains unclear. The French drug regulatory agency’s 2026 approval of intravenous racemic ketamine for severe suicidal crisis marks the first official rapid-acting pharmacological option for imminent suicide risk.

Existing evidence, though limited and marked with very low certainty, suggests that a single intravenous dose of ketamine as an add-on to mood stabilizers may produce a rapid but transient antidepressant effect in bipolar depression.

The antidepressant effect of ketamine appears to be stronger and more sustained for racemic ketamine, while the effects of esketamine are smaller and may diminish after treatment ends.

In February 2022, the US Food and Drug Administration (FDA) issued an alert to healthcare professionals concerning compounded nasal spray products containing ketamine intended to treat depression.

Monitoring and safety in depression treatment

Ketamine is increasingly being used to treat major depressive disorder, due to many first-line and second-line medications not being effective (treatment-resistant depression, TRD). The parameters regarding clinical monitoring and long-term safety need to be transparent as the drug becomes more regulated. Mentioned above, ketamine is a powerful anesthetic often used as a social drug now, and it can have dangerous psychological implications if given the improper dose and type. While the mechanism for depression relief is still unknown, many research organizations, including the Canadian Network for Mood and Anxiety Treatments (CANMAT) are studying the frameworks regarding the efficacy and safety of intravenous racemic ketamine, as used for its antidepressant effects, to provide concrete and evidence-backed recommendations for its use in clinical practice.

In studies that have been performed, single-infusion IV ketamine shows a strong evidence for efficacy as an antidepressant, having enough evidence to prove that it does have substantial impact on relieving treatment-resistant depression. However, in regards to the efficacy and patient safety of repeated infusions as treatment and evidence for relapse prevention of symptoms, there is only level 3 and level 4 evidence respectively, meaning that the evidence is not based in meta-anlayses studies with confidence intervals. The study recommends it as a third-line of treatment with the evidence that currently supports it, with room to keep exploring clinical efficacy and safety.

Bladder problems have been documented with frequent, high-dose nonmedical use of ketamine. However, a systematic review found no clear evidence of increased urinary symptoms, which may suggest smaller doses of single-infusion racemic IV ketamine may be safe for patient use. But most studies did not evaluate long-term treatment and many did not systematically check for symptoms when testing urinary safety.

=== Other uses ===
==== Seizures ====
Ketamine can be used to treat status epilepticus that has not responded to standard treatments, however, current research that supports this use consist of only case studies without any randomized controlled trial data.

==== Agitation ====
Ketamine can be used to treat acute agitation, aggression, and excited delirium in pre-hospital and emergency settings, including symptoms refractory to other drugs such as antipsychotics and benzodiazepines, due to its sedative effect.

==== Asthma ====
Ketamine has been suggested as a possible therapy for children with severe acute asthma who are unresponsive to standard treatment. This is due to its bronchodilator effects on the respiratory system. A 2012 Cochrane review found that there were minimal adverse effects reported from this use, although the studies also showed no significant benefit.

== Contraindications ==
While ketamine could be used as a general anesthetic or as therapy for depression, anxiety, PTSD, or chronic pain, any use should be avoided if any of the following major contraindications are present:

- Severe cardiovascular disease such as unstable angina or poorly controlled hypertension
- Increased intracranial or intraocular pressure (however these remain controversial, with recent studies suggesting otherwise)
- Poorly controlled psychosis
- History of schizophrenia
- Severe liver disease such as cirrhosis
- Pregnancy
- Active substance use disorder (for serial ketamine injections)
- Age less than 3 months

Other mental and emotional considerations include experiencing a current suicidal crisis without support, a lack of emotional support or ongoing care, or having unrealistic expectations on the impact of using ketamine use.

Qualifying for ketamine treatment means going through a medical evaluation and screening process to ensure patients are eligible, and considered a safe candidate, for ketamine therapy.

== Adverse effects ==
Table from the 2010 ISCD study ranking various drugs (legal and illegal) based on statements by drug-harm experts. Ketamine was found to be the 11th overall most dangerous drug.

At anesthetic doses, 10–20% of adults and 1–2% of children experience adverse psychiatric reactions that occur during emergence from anesthesia, ranging from dreams and dysphoria to hallucinations and emergence delirium. Psychotomimetic effects decrease when adding lamotrigine and nimodipine and can be counteracted by pretreatment with a benzodiazepine or propofol. Ketamine anesthesia commonly causes tonic-clonic movements (greater than 10% of people) and rarely hypertonia. Vomiting can be expected in 5–15% of the patients; pretreatment with propofol mitigates it as well. Laryngospasm occurs only rarely with ketamine. Ketamine, generally, stimulates breathing; however, in the first 2–3 minutes of a high-dose rapid intravenous injection, it may cause a transient respiratory depression.

At lower sub-anesthetic doses, psychiatric side effects are prominent. The most common psychiatric side effects are dissociation, visual distortions, and numbness. Also common (20–50%) are difficulty speaking, confusion, euphoria, drowsiness, and difficulty concentrating. Hallucinations are described by 6–10% of people. Dizziness, blurred vision, dry mouth, hypertension, nausea, increased or decreased body temperature, or flushing are the common (>10%) non-psychiatric side effects. All these adverse effects are most pronounced by the end of the injection, dramatically reduced 40 minutes afterward, and completely disappear within 4 hours after the injection.

=== Liver toxicity and urologic disease ===
Urologic diseases occur primarily in people who use large amounts of ketamine routinely, with 20–30% of frequent users having bladder complaints. It includes a range of disorders from cystitis to hydronephrosis to kidney failure. The typical symptoms of ketamine-induced cystitis are frequent urination, dysuria, and urinary urgency sometimes accompanied by pain during urination and blood in urine. The damage to the bladder wall has similarities to both interstitial and eosinophilic cystitis. The wall is thickened and the functional bladder capacity is as low as 10–150 mL. Studies indicate that ketamine-induced cystitis is caused by ketamine and its metabolites directly interacting with urothelium, resulting in damage of the epithelial cells of the bladder lining and increased permeability of the urothelial barrier which results in clinical symptoms.

Management of ketamine-induced cystitis involves ketamine cessation as the first step. This is followed by NSAIDs and anticholinergics and, if the response is insufficient, by tramadol. The second-line treatments are epithelium-protective agents such as oral pentosan polysulfate or intravesical instillation of hyaluronic acid. Intravesical botulinum toxin is also useful. Some research also indicates that epigallocatechin-3-gallate (EGCG) may mitigate bladder dysfunction in ketamine-induced cystitis by normalizing the collagen-to-muscle ratio and restoring storage capacity.

Hepatotoxicity (toxicity to the liver) of ketamine involves higher doses and repeated administration. In a group of chronic high-dose ketamine users, the frequency of liver injury was reported to be about 10%. There are case reports of increased liver enzymes involving ketamine treatment of chronic pain. Chronic ketamine abuse has also been associated with biliary colic, cachexia, gastrointestinal diseases, hepatobiliary disorder, and acute kidney injury.

=== Near-death experience ===
Most people who were able to remember their dreams during ketamine anesthesia report near-death experiences (NDEs) when the broadest possible definition of an NDE is used. Ketamine can reproduce features that commonly have been associated with NDEs. A 2019 large-scale study found that written reports of ketamine experiences had a high degree of similarity to written reports of NDEs in comparison to other written reports of drug experiences.

=== Addiction and tolerance ===
Though there is no evidence that ketamine can cause physical dependence, some people who regularly use it can develop an addiction to it. Animal experiments also confirm the risk of misuse. Additionally, the rapid onset of effects following insufflation may increase potential use as a recreational drug. The short duration of effects promotes bingeing. Ketamine tolerance rapidly develops, even with repeated medical use, prompting the use of higher doses. Some users have reported withdrawal symptoms, primarily anxiety, tremor, sweating, and palpitations, following the attempts to stop; however, these effects have never been objectively measured in the way that physical withdrawal symptoms from drugs like opioids or benzodiazepines have.

=== Brain damage ===
Despite the balance of palliative benefits which planned courses of therapy can confer when patients face serious medical conditions, long-term ketamine abuse is known to cause brain damage, including reduction in both white and grey matter seen on MRI imaging and atrophy seen on CT scans. Cognitive deficits as well as increased dissociation and delusions were observed in frequent recreational users of ketamine.

== Interactions ==
Ketamine potentiates the sedative effects of propofol and midazolam. Naltrexone potentiates psychotomimetic effects of a low dose of ketamine, while lamotrigine and nimodipine decrease them. Clonidine reduces the increase of salivation, heart rate, and blood pressure during ketamine anesthesia and decreases the incidence of nightmares.

Clinical observations suggest that benzodiazepines may diminish the antidepressant effects of ketamine. It appears most conventional antidepressants can be safely combined with ketamine.

== Pharmacology ==
=== Pharmacodynamics ===
==== Mechanism of action ====
Ketamine is a mixture of equal amounts of two enantiomers: esketamine and arketamine. Esketamine is a far more potent NMDA receptor pore blocker than arketamine. Pore blocking of the NMDA receptor is responsible for the anesthetic, analgesic, and psychotomimetic effects of ketamine. Blocking of the NMDA receptor results in analgesia by preventing central sensitization in dorsal horn neurons; in other words, ketamine's actions interfere with pain transmission in the spinal cord.

The mechanism of action of ketamine in alleviating depression is not well understood, but it is an area of active investigation. Due to the hypothesis that NMDA receptor antagonism underlies the antidepressant effects of ketamine, esketamine was developed as an antidepressant. However, multiple other NMDA receptor antagonists, including memantine, lanicemine, rislenemdaz, rapastinel, and 4-chlorokynurenine, have thus far failed to demonstrate significant effectiveness for depression. Furthermore, animal research indicates that arketamine, the enantiomer with a weaker NMDA receptor antagonism, as well as (2R,6R)-hydroxynorketamine, the metabolite with negligible affinity for the NMDA receptor but potent alpha-7 nicotinic receptor antagonist activity, may have antidepressant action. This furthers the argument that NMDA receptor antagonism may not be primarily responsible for the antidepressant effects of ketamine. Acute inhibition of the lateral habenula, a part of the brain responsible for inhibiting the mesolimbic reward pathway and referred to as the "anti-reward center", is another possible mechanism for ketamine's antidepressant effects, a mechanism that can also be effected by other drugs treating similar neurotransmitters.

Possible biochemical mechanisms of ketamine's antidepressant action include direct action on the NMDA receptor and downstream effects on regulators such as brain-derived neurotrophic factor (BDNF) and mTOR. It is not clear whether ketamine alone is sufficient for antidepressant action or if its metabolites are also important. The active metabolite of ketamine, hydroxynorketamine, which does not significantly interact with the NMDA receptor but nonetheless indirectly activates AMPA receptors, may also or alternatively be involved in the rapid-onset antidepressant effects of ketamine. As an NMDA receptor antagonist, ketamine triggers a paradoxical acute burst of glutamate by selectively blocking inhibitory GABAergic neurons. This surge activates AMPA receptors, which modulate downstream signaling pathways in the limbic system to produce rapid antidepressant effects. Such downstream actions of the activation of AMPA receptors include upregulation of BDNF and activation of its signaling receptor tropomyosin receptor kinase B (TrkB), activation of the mammalian target of rapamycin (mTOR) pathway, deactivation of glycogen synthase kinase 3 (GSK-3), and inhibition of the phosphorylation of the eukaryotic elongation factor 2 (eEF2) kinase.

==== Molecular targets ====
Ketamine and biological targets (with K_{i} below 100 μM)
Site	Value (μM)	Type	Action	Species	Ref
NMDA (PCP)	0.25–0.66	K_{i}	Antagonist	Human	
MOR	42	K_{i}	Agonist	Human	
MOR_{2}	12.1	K_{i}	Antagonist	Human	
KOR	28; 25	K_{i} K_{i}	Antagonist; Agonist	Human	
σ_{2}	26	K_{i}	ND	Rat	
D_{2}	0.5 >10	K_{i} K_{i}	Agonist; ND	Human	
M_{1}	45	K_{i}	ND	Human	
α_{2}β_{2}	92	IC_{50}	Antagonist	Human	
α_{2}β_{4}	29	IC_{50}	Antagonist	Human	
α_{3}β_{2}	50	IC_{50}	Antagonist	Human	
α_{3}β_{4}	9.5	IC_{50}	Antagonist	Human	
α_{4}β_{2}	72	IC_{50}	Antagonist	Human	
α_{4}β_{4}	18	IC_{50}	Antagonist	Human	
α_{7}	3.1 (HNK)	IC_{50}	NAM	Rat	
ERα	0.34	K_{i}	ND	Human	
NET	82–291	IC_{50}	Inhibitor	Human	
DAT	63	K_{i}	Inhibitor	Rat	
HCN1	8–16	EC_{50}	Inhibitor	Mouse	
TRPV1	1-100	K_{i}	Agonist	Rat	
The smaller the value, the stronger the interaction with the site.

Ketamine principally acts as a pore blocker of the NMDA receptor, an ionotropic glutamate receptor. The S-(+) and R-(–) stereoisomers of ketamine bind to the dizocilpine site of the NMDA receptor with different affinities, the former showing approximately 3- to 4-fold greater affinity for the receptor than the latter. As a result, the S isomer is a more potent anesthetic and analgesic than its R counterpart.

Ketamine may interact with and inhibit the NMDAR via another allosteric site on the receptor.

With a couple of exceptions, ketamine's actions at other receptors are far weaker than its antagonism of the NMDA receptor (see the activity table to the right).

Although ketamine is a very weak ligand of the monoamine transporters (K_{i} > 60 μM), it has been suggested that it may interact with allosteric sites on the monoamine transporters to produce monoamine reuptake inhibition. However, no functional inhibition (IC_{50}) of the human monoamine transporters has been observed with ketamine or its metabolites at concentrations of up to 10,000 nM. Moreover, animal studies and at least three human case reports have found no interaction between ketamine and the monoamine oxidase inhibitor (MAOI) tranylcypromine, which is of importance as the combination of a monoamine reuptake inhibitor with an MAOI can produce severe toxicity such as serotonin syndrome or hypertensive crisis. Collectively, these findings shed doubt on the involvement of monoamine reuptake inhibition in the effects of ketamine in humans. Ketamine has been found to increase dopaminergic neurotransmission in the brain, but instead of being due to dopamine reuptake inhibition, this may be via indirect/downstream mechanisms, namely through antagonism of the NMDA receptor.

Whether ketamine is an agonist of D_{2} receptors is controversial. Early research by the Philip Seeman group found ketamine to be a D_{2} partial agonist with a potency similar to that of its NMDA receptor antagonism. However, later studies by different researchers found the affinity of ketamine of >10 μM for the regular human and rat D_{2} receptors, Moreover, whereas D_{2} receptor agonists such as bromocriptine can rapidly and powerfully suppress prolactin secretion, subanesthetic doses of ketamine have not been found to do this in humans and in fact, have been found to dose-dependently increase prolactin levels. Imaging studies have shown mixed results on inhibition of striatal [^{11}C] raclopride binding by ketamine in humans, with some studies finding a significant decrease and others finding no such effect. However, changes in [^{11}C] raclopride binding may be due to changes in dopamine concentrations induced by ketamine rather than binding of ketamine to the D_{2} receptor.

==== Relationships between levels and effects ====
Dissociation and psychotomimetic effects are reported in people treated with ketamine at plasma concentrations of approximately 100 to 250 ng/mL (0.42–1.1 μM). The typical intravenous antidepressant dosage of ketamine used to treat depression is low and results in maximal plasma concentrations of 70 to 200 ng/mL (0.29–0.84 μM). At similar plasma concentrations (70 to 160 ng/mL; 0.29–0.67 μM) it also shows analgesic effects. In 1–5 minutes after inducing anesthesia by rapid intravenous injection of ketamine, its plasma concentration reaches as high as 60–110 μM. When the anesthesia was maintained using nitrous oxide together with continuous injection of ketamine, the ketamine concentration stabilized at approximately 9.3 μM. In an experiment with purely ketamine anesthesia, people began to awaken once the plasma level of ketamine decreased to about 2,600 ng/mL (11 μM) and became oriented in place and time when the level was down to 1,000 ng/mL (4 μM). In a single-case study, the concentration of ketamine in cerebrospinal fluid, a proxy for the brain concentration, during anesthesia varied between 2.8 and 6.5 μM and was approximately 40% lower than in plasma.

=== Pharmacokinetics ===
Ketamine can be absorbed by many different routes due to its water and lipid solubility. Intravenous ketamine bioavailability is 100% by definition, intramuscular injection bioavailability is slightly lower at 93%, and epidural bioavailability is 77%. Subcutaneous bioavailability has never been measured but is presumed to be high. Among the less invasive routes, the intranasal route has the highest bioavailability (45–50%) and oral – the lowest (16–20%). Sublingual and rectal bioavailabilities are intermediate at approximately 25–50%.

After absorption ketamine is rapidly distributed into the brain and other tissues. The plasma protein binding of ketamine is variable at 23–47%.

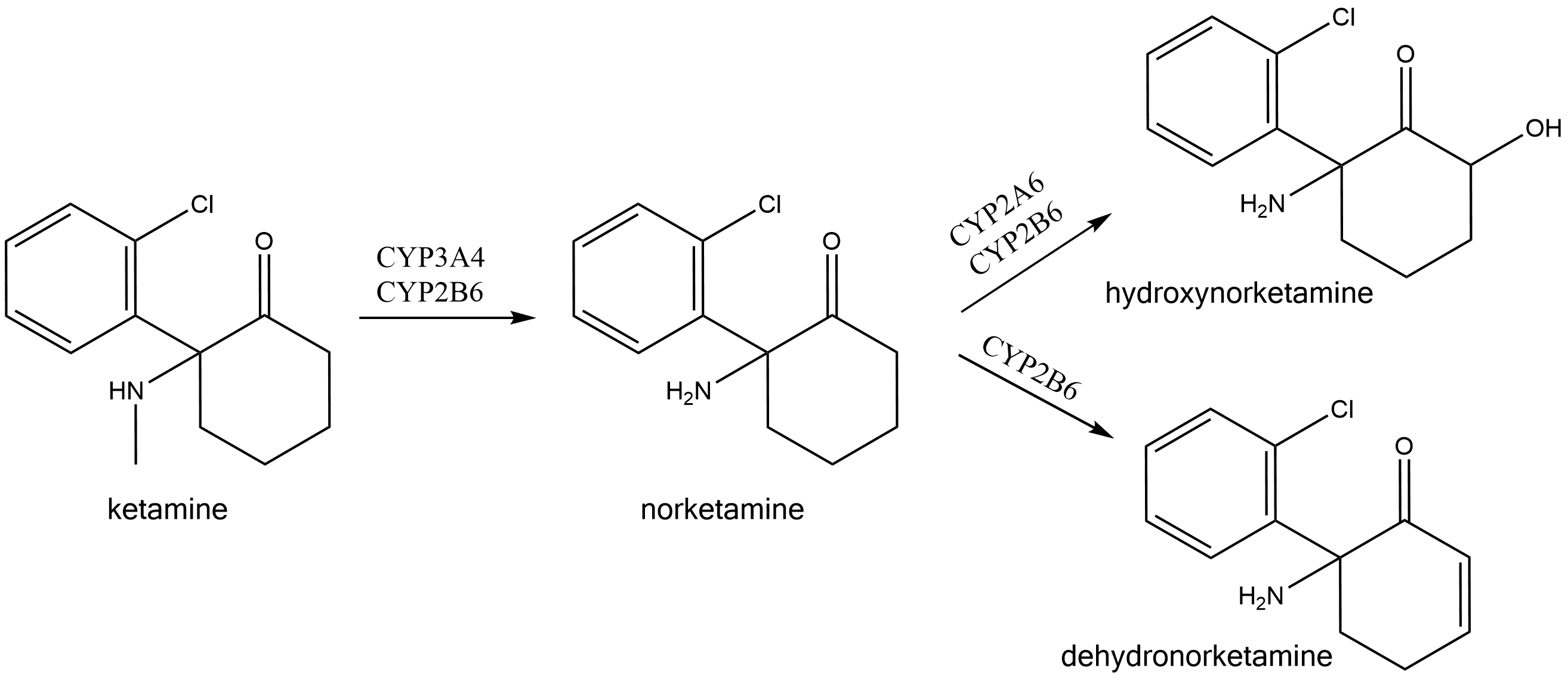
Major routes of ketamine metabolism

In the body, ketamine undergoes extensive metabolism. It is biotransformed by CYP3A4 and CYP2B6 isoenzymes into norketamine, which, in turn, is converted by CYP2A6 and CYP2B6 into hydroxynorketamine and dehydronorketamine. Low oral bioavailability of ketamine is due to the first-pass effect and, possibly, ketamine intestinal metabolism by CYP3A4. As a result, norketamine plasma levels are several-fold higher than ketamine following oral administration, and norketamine may play a role in anesthetic and analgesic action of oral ketamine. This also explains why oral ketamine levels are independent of CYP2B6 activity, unlike subcutaneous ketamine levels.

After an intravenous injection of tritium-labelled ketamine, 91% of the radioactivity is recovered from urine and 3% from feces. The medication is excreted mostly in the form of metabolites, with only 2% remaining unchanged. Conjugated hydroxylated derivatives of ketamine (80%) followed by dehydronorketamine (16%) are the most prevalent metabolites detected in urine.

=== Pharmacogenetics ===
The study of the pharmacogenetics of ketamine examines how certain genetic variations can impact responses, metabolism, and side effects from person to person when receiving ketamine or esketamine for anesthesia, pain management, and treatment-resistant depression. It can also explain the different individual reactions that users of recreational ketamine experience.

Key genetic and metabolic factors that influence the breakdown of ketamine in the body include:

==== Cytochrome p450 enzymes ====
Ketamine, alongside its active metabolite norketamine, are broken down by the liver's polymorphic P450 enzymes, such as CYP2B6, CYP3A4, and CYP2C9. Certain variants of these enzymes, like CYP2B6*6, can reduce catalytic activity and intrinsic clearance of the drug, resulting in a higher plasma drug exposure which can exacerabte an individual's reaction to ketamine by increasing the severity of dissociative or adverse side effects.

==== Brain-derived neurotropic factor (BDNF) ====
The BDNF Val66Met (rs6265) functional polymorphism, specifically the Met allele, has been associated in systematic reviews with reduced antidepressant and anti-suicidal efficacy following ketamine administration. Individuals with this genetic code may have a greater benefit for IV ketamine as a treatment for treatment-resistant depression.

==== Norepinehprine transporter (NET) ====
The NET gene (with variants such as rs28386840) has shown correlation with a higher risk of cardiovascular complications, including severe treatment-emergent hypertension, indicating that mutations in this gene may produce the opposite effect of the drug's standard effect on hypertension.

==== Emergence phenomena & receptors ====
Pilot studied have explored candidate genes like GRIN2B, encoding a subunit of the NMDA receptor that ketamine targets, in relation to post-anesthesia emergence phenomena, including vivid hallucinations, agitation, delirium, and disassociation. However, large-scale clinical validations on these studies remains limited.

Genetic expression and their subsequent reactions to ketamine vary from individual to individual, which is why side effects vary based on individual and external circumstances like age, dose, environment, and more. Ongoing studies are still evaluating pharmacological genetic impact and how that affects dosing.

== Chemistry ==
=== Structure ===
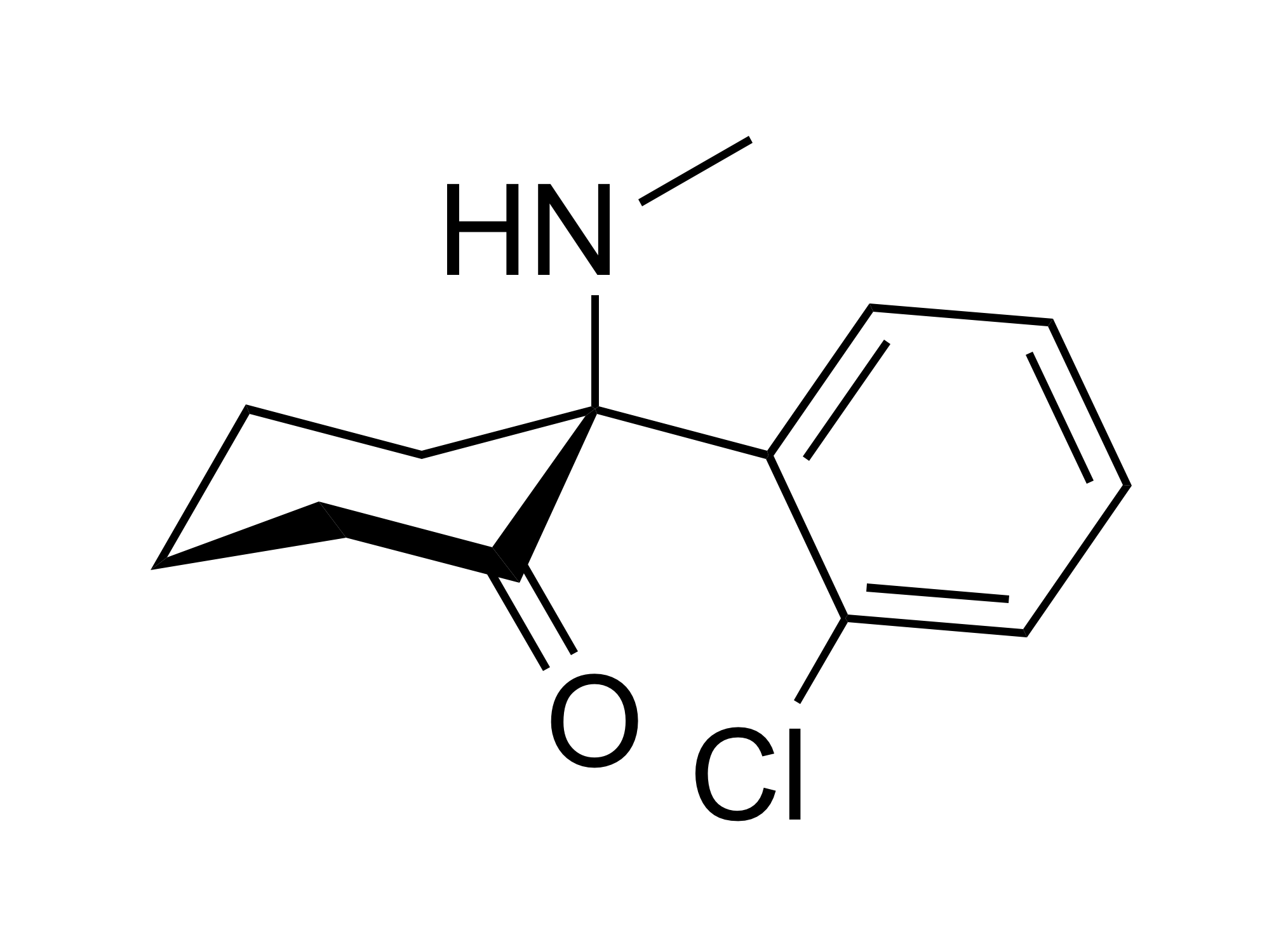
(S)-ketamine

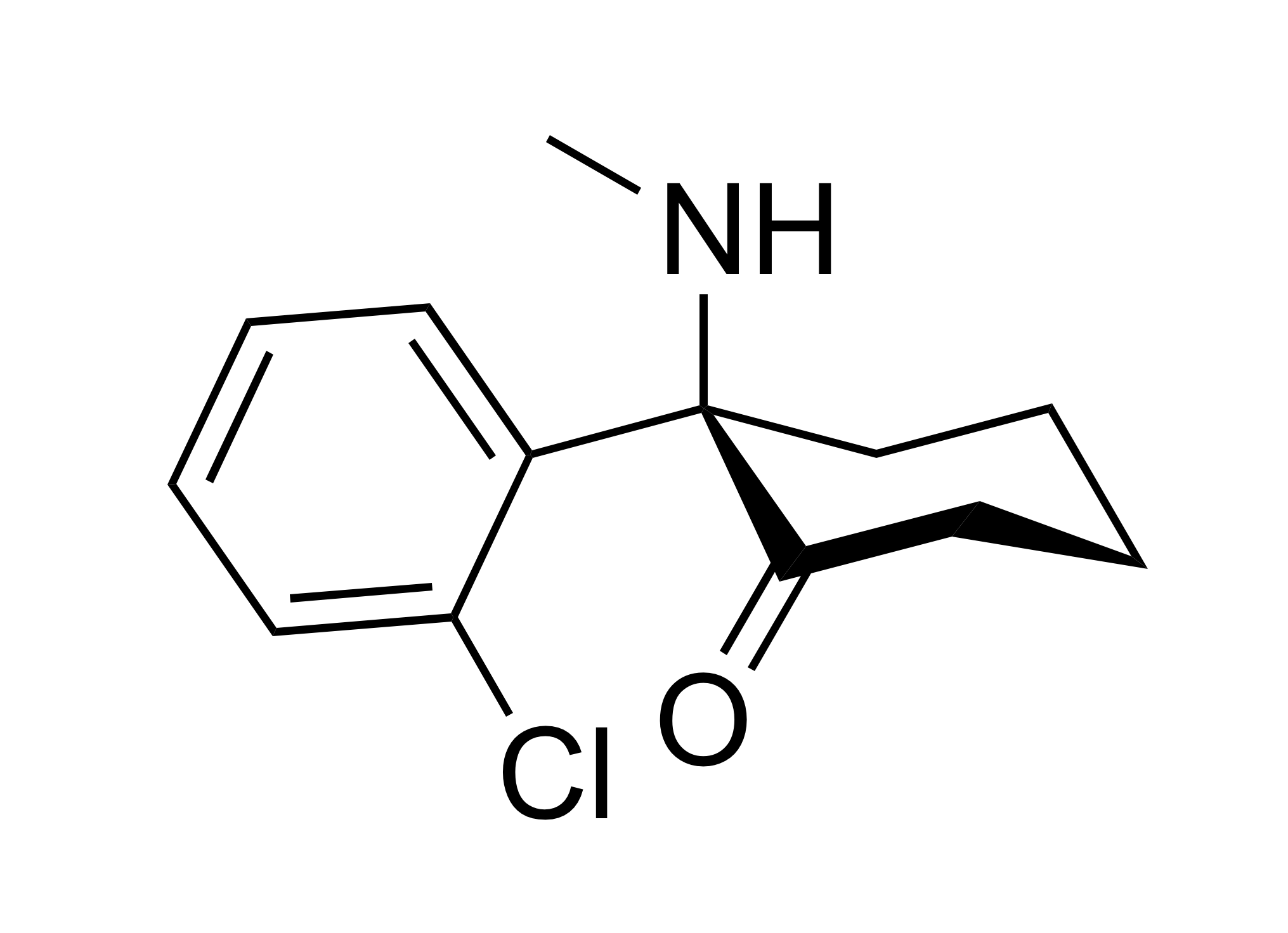
(R)-ketamine

The IUPAC name for ketamine is 2-(2-chlorophenyl)-2-(methylamino)-cyclohexanone. In chemical structure, ketamine is an arylcyclohexylamine derivative. Ketamine is a chiral compound, meaning it exists as a racemic mixture of two mirror-image enantiomers, pictured above. The more active enantiomer, esketamine (S-ketamine), is also available for medical use under the brand name Ketanest S, while the less active enantiomer, arketamine (R-ketamine), has never been marketed as an enantiopure drug for clinical use. While S-ketamine is more effective as an analgesic and anesthetic through NMDA receptor antagonism, R-ketamine produces longer-lasting effects as an antidepressant.

Esketamine	Arketamine
S-enantiomer of ketamine	R-enantiomer of ketamine
High affinity with 4-folds for the NMDA receptor	Lower affinity for the NMDA receptor
Three times stronger analgesic effects	Weaker NMDA antagonism, so weaker analgesic effects
1.5 times greater anesthetic efficacy	Less potent as an anesthetic
8 times potent dopamine reuptake inhibitor	A greater and longer-lasting antidepressant
Highly addictive due to more dopaminergic activity	Lower abuse potential, fewer psychotomimetic side effects, treats neurological disorder like Alzheimer's, Parkinson's, etc.
FDA- and EMA-approved controlled substance	Not yet FDA-approved for depression
Administered as a nasal spray	IV, IM, or Tablets

The optical rotation of a given enantiomer of ketamine can vary between its salts and free base form. The free base form of (S)‑ketamine exhibits dextrorotation and is therefore labelled (S)‑(+)‑ketamine. However, its hydrochloride salt shows levorotation and is thus labelled (S)‑(−)‑ketamine hydrochloride.

=== Detection ===
Ketamine may be quantified in blood or plasma to confirm a diagnosis of poisoning in hospitalized people, provide evidence in an impaired driving arrest, or assist in a medicolegal death investigation. Blood or plasma ketamine concentrations are usually in a range of 0.5–5.0 mg/L in persons receiving the drug therapeutically (during general anesthesia), 1–2 mg/L in those arrested for impaired driving, and 3–20 mg/L in victims of acute fatal overdosage. Urine is often the preferred specimen for routine drug use monitoring purposes. The presence of norketamine, a pharmacologically active metabolite, is useful for confirmation of ketamine ingestion.

== Natural occurrence ==
Long thought to be a synthetic compound, ketamine was reported to occur naturally as a product of the nematophagous fungus Pochonia chlamydosporia in 2020. It was theorized to function as a nematicide or anthelmintic as part of plant defense against herbivory. Though an apparent natural product of certain fungi, the quantities of ketamine produced by said species are very small.

== History ==
Ketamine was first discovered while trying to find alternatives to phencyclidine (PCP), a powerful analgesic that was discovered by chemists at Parke Davis Company in 1956. While its effects showed that it was a safe and reliable analgesic, it also showed prolonged emergence delirium that remained a danger to human use. As a result, scientists redirected their focus to finding analogous chemicals to PCP that acted as a strong analgesic, but would have less emergence delirium.

Ketamine was first synthesized in 1962 by Calvin L. Stevens, a professor of chemistry at Wayne State University and a Parke-Davis consultant, and it was identified as a structural analog that only had one-tenth of the potency of PCP. It was known by the developmental code name CI-581. After promising preclinical research in animals, ketamine was tested in a clinical trial with 20 human prisoner participants in 1964, led by Dr. Edward Domino and Dr. Guenter Corssen. Their initial clinical trial found that the drug could be safe and effective due to its reduced behavioral toxicity and short duration of action. In 1966, they published more findings reporting that ketamine could be used as an anesthetic with minimum side effects as compared to PCP. In publications, due to the "disconnected" appearance of treated people, Edward F. Domino's wife Toni suggested describing it as "dissociative anesthesia". Later in 1970, ketalar became the first FDA-approved formulation of ketamine, and ketamine anesthesia was first given to American soldiers during the Vietnam War.

In the 1980s, ketamine gained popularity in party and rave culture, becoming available on the streets in the form of capsules, powders, tablets, solutions, and injections. By the 1990s, ketamine was medically utilized as anesthesia, but was being abused on the streets, earning the nickname of "Special K". In 1999, ketamine became a federally controlled substance in the United States to halt its illicit use.

In the 2000s and as ketamine became a controlled substance, it became used less both medically and illicitly. However, during this time, it was discovered that ketamine could alleviate depression and suicidal thoughts, which has been described as the single most important advance in the treatment of depression in more than 50 years. It has sparked interest in NMDA receptor antagonists for depression, and has shifted the direction of not only antidepressant research and development, but also treatment for PTSD, anxiety, bipolar disorder, and pain management.

== Society and culture ==
=== Legal status ===
The World Health Organization (WHO) lists injectable ketamine as an essential general anesthetic for adults and children. Injectable ketamine is valuable in medical settings for its unique safety profile as a general anesthetic, providing non-opioid pain relief, and rapid antidepressant effects. In setting where there is limited access to medical equipment of inhaled anesthesia, ketamine access is especially important as it can preserve breathing and airway reflexes while still acting as a sedative.

WHO's Expert Committee on Drug Dependence acknowledged wide concerns on its recreational and nonmedical use and recommended against international scheduling. Additionally, the Committee also stated that countries should adopt their own controls while preserving ready access for surgery and anesthesia to ensure availability for medical and scientific use. In terms of regulation, ketamine remains outside international drug control schedules as per the WHO, allowing individual countries to regulate it under national law as they see fit.

While ketamine is marketed legally in many countries worldwide, it is also a controlled substance in many countries.

- In Australia, ketamine is listed as a Schedule 8 controlled drug under the Poisons Standard (October 2015).
- In Canada, ketamine has been classified as a Schedule I narcotic since 2005.
- In December 2013, the government of India, in response to rising recreational use and the use of ketamine as a date rape drug, added it to Schedule X of the Drug and Cosmetics Act, requiring a special license for sale and maintenance of records of all sales for two years.
- In the United Kingdom, it was labeled a Class B drug on 12 February 2014. In 2025, the Home Office requested a review of the classification with a view to changing it to Class A, based on an increase in recreational use and the negative health consequences.
- The increase in recreational use prompted ketamine to be placed in Schedule III of the United States Controlled Substances Act in August 1999.

=== Recreational use ===
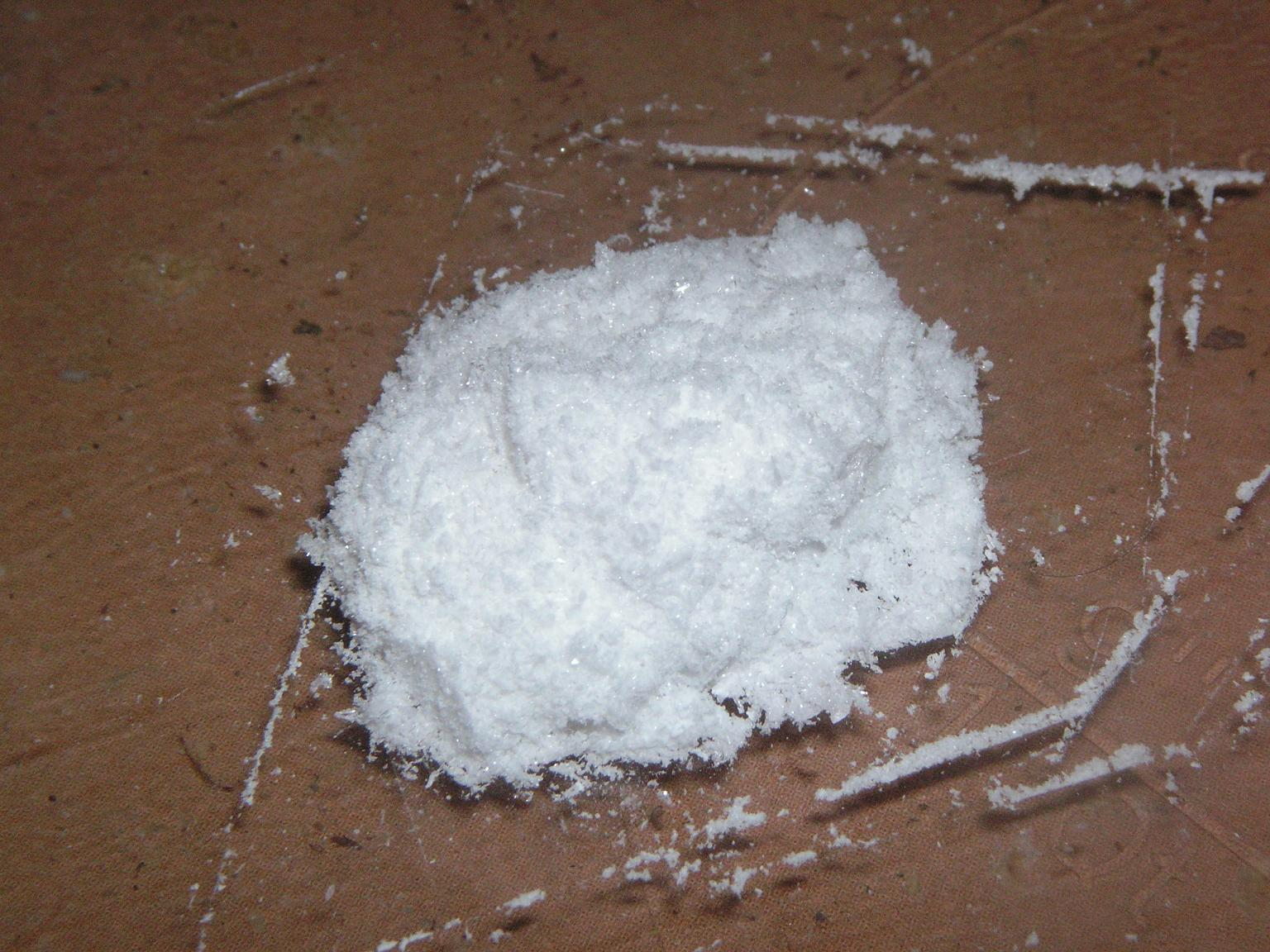
Ketamine hydrochloride on a glass plate

At sub-anesthetic doses, ketamine produces a dissociative state, characterized by a sense of detachment from one's physical body and the external world that is known as depersonalization and derealization. At sufficiently high doses, users may experience what is called the "K-hole", a state of dissociation with visual and auditory hallucination. John C. Lilly, Marcia Moore, and D. M. Turner (among others) have written extensively about their own entheogenic and psychonautic experiences with ketamine. Turner died prematurely due to drowning during presumed unsupervised ketamine use.

Recreational ketamine use has been implicated in deaths globally, with more than 90 deaths in England and Wales in 2005–2013. They include accidental poisonings, drownings, traffic accidents, and suicides. The majority of deaths were among young people. Several months after being found dead in his hot tub, actor Matthew Perry's October 2023 apparent death by drowning was revealed to have been caused by a ketamine overdose, and, while other factors were present, the acute effects of ketamine were ruled to be the primary cause of death. Due to its ability to cause confusion and amnesia, ketamine has been used for date rape.

== Research ==
A 2023 meta-analysis found that racemic ketamine, particularly at higher doses, is more effective than esketamine in reducing depression severity, with more sustained benefits over time. No biomarker has been validated to predict ketamine’s antidepressant response; it may modulate depression-associated neurocircuitry and inflammatory pathways.

Ketamine appears to provide rapid (<12 h) and sustained (up to 1–2 weeks) reduction in anxiety across various clinical settings, with improvements correlating with depression improvements but not with peak dissociation. Ketamine has shown potential for rapid and tolerable symptom relief in obsessive-compulsive disorder, but evidence is limited and inconsistent.

Several systematic reviews and meta-analyses suggest ketamine may produce short-term (≈ 24 hr) reductions in post-traumatic stress disorder symptoms, but overall evidence quality is low, long-term effects are unclear, and side effects occur.

Ketamine shows promising short-term effects in reducing withdrawal, cravings, and improving abstinence across substance use disorders, especially when combined with therapy; however, evidence remains limited and heterogeneous, with unresolved concerns about optimal dosing, long-term safety, and misuse risk.

Ketamine, especially when combined with psychotherapy, shows potential to reduce alcohol and cocaine use, but evidence is limited, mixed, and low-quality, with inconclusive results for opioids.

The British critical psychiatrist Joanna Moncrieff has critiqued the use and study of ketamine and related drugs like psychedelics for treatment of psychiatric disorders, highlighting concerns including excessive hype around these drugs, questionable biologically-based theories of benefit, blurred lines between medical and recreational use, flawed clinical trial findings, financial conflicts of interest, strong expectancy effects and large placebo responses, small and short-term benefits over placebo, and their potential for difficult experiences and adverse effects, among others.

Clinical trial research is continuously being conducted for ketamine's effect as treatment for depression. For example, treatment-resistant bipolar depression was tested through a 2026 JAMA Psychiatry Ket-BD study, where serial intravenous ketamine infusions were compared to midazolam in patients, and showed promising effects. Additionally, a 2026 Stanford Medicine study tested a single low-dose ketamine infusion with daily low-dose buprenorphine for four weeks and saw sustained antisuicidal effects for a month, highlighting the research being done to prolong antidepressant effects of ketamine. Another study from Vanderbilt is experimenting with intracellular signaling pathways to stretch the neuroplastic benefits of a single dose.

Within this research on ketamine therapy, there are also studies being done on comparing ketamine delivery methods, including McLean and Harvard's study on intravenous ketamine vs. intranasal esketamine. Other clinical investigations and pilot studies are being conducted to see if ketamine therapy can be used for conditions beyond depression, anxiety, and PTSD, including eating disorders, obsessive-compulsive disorder, and perioperative pain management. Studies are also evaluating if ketamine can be used for conditions like seizures, agitation, and asthma.

As ketamine is being explored for additional medical uses, research is ongoing on the adverse effects ketamine can have on individuals and the pharmacogenetics in relation to that. New medical uses also demand new policies and regulations on how ketamine should be administered, monitored, and adapted.

== Veterinary uses ==
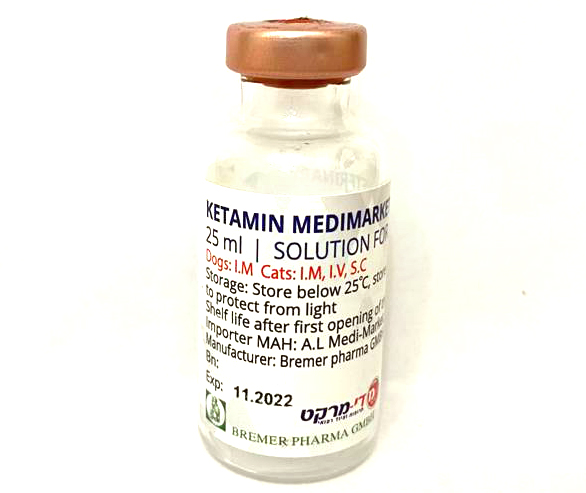
An empty vial of Ketamine used by veterinarians for injection

In veterinary anesthesia, ketamine is often used for its anesthetic and analgesic effects on cats, dogs, rabbits, rats, and other small animals. It is frequently used in induction and anesthetic maintenance in horses. It is an important part of the "rodent cocktail", a mixture of drugs used for anesthetising rodents. Veterinarians often use ketamine with sedative drugs to produce balanced anesthesia and analgesia, and as a constant-rate infusion to help prevent pain wind-up. Ketamine is also used to manage pain among large animals. It is the primary intravenous anesthetic agent used in equine surgery, often in conjunction with detomidine and thiopental, or sometimes guaifenesin.

Ketamine appears not to produce sedation or anesthesia in snails. Instead, it appears to have an excitatory effect.
