= Ketofol =

Combination drug

Combination of
- Ketamine: General anesthetic
- Propofol: General anesthetic

Identifiers
- CAS Number: 1228575-05-0

Ketofol is a mixture of ketamine and propofol. Both drugs are anesthetic agents. It can be mixed with propofol in the same syringe.

The combination appears to be safer than propofol by itself when used for procedural sedation and analgesia.
