= Rodent cocktail =

Anesthetic mixture

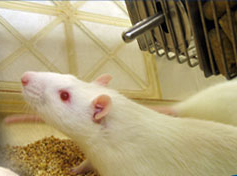

Rodent cocktail is an anesthetic mixture used for rodents in research. The injectable, clear liquid is a mixture of ketamine, xylazine, and acepromazine. The ratio used depends on the species of rodent. This mixture is often preferred by researchers because of its low mortality in rodents, its relatively quick recovery time (one hour after injection), and low cost.
