= Calvin L. Stevens =

American chemist

Calvin Lee Stevens (November 3, 1923 – November 26, 2014) was an American chemist. He was a professor of organic chemistry at Wayne State University, and is known for being the first to synthesize the drug ketamine.

== Early life and education ==
Stevens was born in Edwardsville, Illinois, to Arthur Allen Stevens and Irma E. Ambuehl. He earned a Bachelor of Science at the University of Illinois, and in 1947 a Ph.D. in organic chemistry from the University of Wisconsin in the field of substituted ketene acetals and related orthoesters.

== Career ==
Stevens received a postdoctoral fellowship at the Massachusetts Institute of Technology. He joined the staff of Wayne State University in Detroit, Michigan, in 1948 and became a full professor of chemistry there in 1954. He subsequently served as chairman of the chemistry department, Vice President for Research, and Interim Provost to the University.

In 1958 he was a member of the Cancer Chemotherapy National Service organization.

Stevens received a Guggenheim Fellowship at the Sorbonne in 1955. He served as a Scientific Officer for the U.S. Embassy in London in 1959.

In 1962, while a consultant at the Parke-Davis Laboratories, he synthesized the drug ketamine, which is commonly used as a general anesthetic.

Stevens received two Fulbright Fellowships in 1964 and 1971. He was a tenured Professor Associe at the University of Paris VI. In 1982 he was awarded an honorary Doctorate of Science from the University of Nancy.

Stevens died on November 26, 2014, at the age of 91.
