= BMS-986187 =

Chemical compound

Clinical data
- Other names: BMS986187
- Drug class: Opioid receptor positive allosteric modulator

Identifiers
- IUPAC name: 3,3,6,6-tetramethyl-9-[4-[(2-methylphenyl)methoxy]phenyl]-4,5,7,9-tetrahydro-2H-xanthene-1,8-dione
- CAS Number: 684238-37-7
- PubChem CID: 17379334
- IUPHAR/BPS: 9748
- ChemSpider: 12814254
- ChEMBL: ChEMBL3426789

Chemical and physical data
- Formula: C_{31}H_{34}O_{4}
- Molar mass: 470.609 g·mol^{−1}
- 3D model (JSmol): Interactive image
- SMILES: CC1=CC=CC=C1COC2=CC=C(C=C2)C3C4=C(CC(CC4=O)(C)C)OC5=C3C(=O)CC(C5)(C)C
- InChI: InChI=1S/C31H34O4/c1-19-8-6-7-9-21(19)18-34-22-12-10-20(11-13-22)27-28-23(32)14-30(2,3)16-25(28)35-26-17-31(4,5)15-24(33)29(26)27/h6-13,27H,14-18H2,1-5H3; Key:UEKIYVKPQNKSDI-UHFFFAOYSA-N

BMS-986187 is a positive allosteric modulator (PAM) of the δ-opioid receptor (DOR) and the κ-opioid receptor (KOR).

The drug is highly potent as a DOR PAM, with an EC_{50} of 30 nM. It has been found to increase the affinity of the endogenous peptide DOR agonist leu-enkephalin for the receptor by 32-fold. The drug has been found to act as a biased allosteric agonist of the DOR, activating G protein signaling (EC_{50} = 301 nM; E_{max} = 92%) but with little capacity to recruit β-arrestin (EC_{50} = 579 μM) (bias factor = 1787). Although a PAM, BMS-986187 is able to activate the DOR even in the absence of an orthosteric agonist, and as such, has been referred to as an "ago-PAM".

Subsequent to its discovery, BMS-987187 was found to act as a potent KOR PAM as well. It is also a weak μ-opioid receptor (MOR) PAM (EC_{50} = 3,000 nM), but has 100-fold selectivity for potentiation of the DOR over the MOR. BMS-986187 has about 20- to 30-fold higher affinity for the conserved allosteric site on the DOR and KOR relative to the corresponding site on the MOR. It is not a PAM of the nociceptin receptor, which is less homologous to the other opioid receptors.

The drug was first described by 2015 and was the first selective DOR PAM as well as the first selective KOR PAM to be discovered. It was identified via high-throughput screening (HTS). DOR PAMs like BMS-986187 might prove to be useful in the clinical treatment of certain gastrointestinal disorders.

== See also ==
- BMS‐986122
