= Esketamine =

Medication

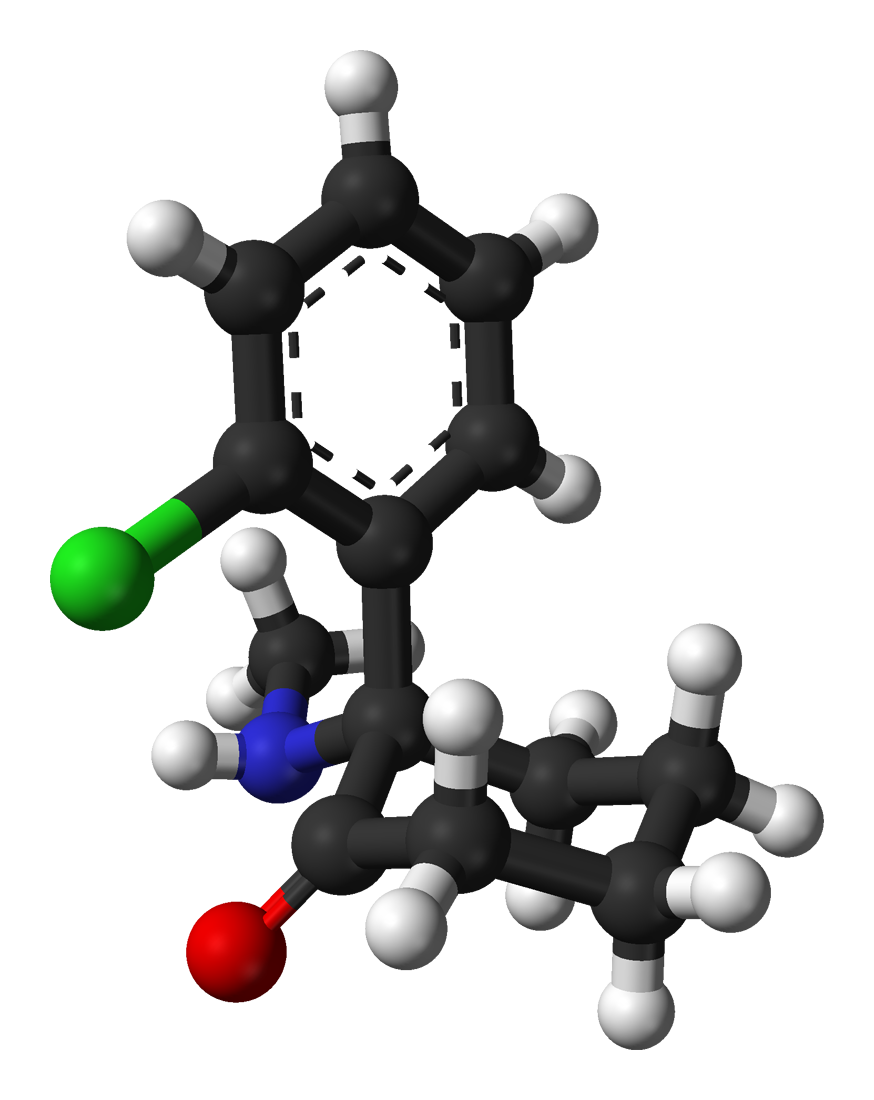

Clinical data
- Trade names: Spravato, Ketanest, Spravado, others
- Other names: (S)-Ketamine; S(+)-Ketamine; JNJ-54135419
- AHFS/Drugs.com: Monograph
- MedlinePlus: a619017
- License data: EU EMA: by INN; US DailyMed: Esketamine; US FDA: Esketamine
- Pregnancy category: AU: B3
- Addiction liability: Moderate
- Routes of administration: Intranasal, intravenous
- Drug class: NMDA receptor antagonist; Antidepressant; General anesthetic; Dissociative hallucinogen; Analgesic
- ATC code: N01AX14 (WHO) N06AX27 (WHO)

Legal status
- Legal status: AU: S8 (Controlled drug); BR: Class B1 (Psychoactive drugs); CA: ℞-only; UK: Class B / Schedule 2; US: Schedule III; EU: Rx-only; In general: ℞ (Prescription only)

Pharmacokinetic data
- Bioavailability: Intranasal: 30–50%
- Elimination half-life: 5 hours

Identifiers
- IUPAC name: (S)-2-(2-chlorophenyl)-2-(methylamino)cyclohexanone
- CAS Number: 33643-46-8; HCl: 33643-47-9
- PubChem CID: 182137
- IUPHAR/BPS: 9152
- DrugBank: DB01221; HCl: DBSALT002086
- ChemSpider: 158414; HCl: 26332012
- UNII: 50LFG02TXD; HCl: L8P1H35P2Z
- KEGG: D07283; HCl: D10627
- ChEBI: CHEBI:60799; HCl: CHEBI:60800
- ChEMBL: ChEMBL395091; HCl: ChEMBL2364609
- PDB ligand: JC9 (PDBe, RCSB PDB)
- CompTox Dashboard (EPA): DTXSID6047810
- ECHA InfoCard: 100.242.065

Chemical and physical data
- Formula: C_{13}H_{16}ClNO
- Molar mass: 237.73 g·mol^{−1}
- 3D model (JSmol): Interactive image
- SMILES: CN[C@]1(c2ccccc2Cl)CCCCC1=O
- InChI: InChI=1S/C13H16ClNO/c1-15-13(9-5-4-8-12(13)16)10-6-2-3-7-11(10)14/h2-3,6-7,15H,4-5,8-9H2,1H3/t13-/m0/s1; Key:YQEZLKZALYSWHR-ZDUSSCGKSA-N

Esketamine, sold under the brand names Spravato (for depression) and Ketanest (for anesthesia) among others, is the S(+) enantiomer of ketamine. It is a dissociative medication used as a general anesthetic and as an antidepressant. Esketamine is the active enantiomer of ketamine in terms of NMDA receptor antagonism and is more potent than racemic ketamine. However, racemic ketamine may produce larger and more sustained antidepressant effects than esketamine.

As an anesthetic, esketamine is indicated for high-risk patients or as a supplement to incomplete regional anesthesia. As an antidepressant, it is specifically used as both a monotherapy and combination therapy for treatment-resistant depression (TRD) as well as major depressive disorder (MDD) with co-occurring suicidal ideation or behavior. When administered for four weeks, its efficacy as combination therapy for TRD is modest and similar to that of atypical antipsychotics; evidence for its efficacy as a monotherapy is very limited. Therefore, most clinicians administer esketamine twice weekly for the first four weeks, and once weekly for at least four more weeks. Antisuicidal efficacy remains unproven. Esketamine is not used by infusion into a vein for depression as it is only FDA-approved in the form of a nasal spray under direct medical supervision for this indication (the parent compound ketamine is most often administered intravenously).

Adverse effects of esketamine include dissociation, dizziness, sedation, nausea, vomiting, vertigo, numbness, anxiety, lethargy, increased blood pressure, and feelings of drunkenness. Less often, esketamine can cause bladder problems. Esketamine acts primarily as a NMDA receptor antagonist. Esketamine has faster clearance and stronger dopamine inhibition than arketamine, contributing to its dissociative and psychotomimetic effects.

In the form of racemic ketamine, esketamine was first synthesized in 1962 and introduced for medical use as an anesthetic in 1970. Enantiopure esketamine was introduced for medical use as an anesthetic in 1997 and as an antidepressant in 2019. It is used as an anesthetic in the European Union and as an antidepressant in the United States and Canada. Due to misuse liability as a dissociative, esketamine is a controlled substance.

== Medical uses ==
=== Anesthesia ===
Esketamine is used for similar indications as ketamine. Such uses include induction of anesthesia in high-risk patients such as those with circulatory shock, severe bronchospasm, or as a supplement to regional anesthesia with incomplete nerve blocks.

Esketamine binds more strongly to NMDA receptors than racemic ketamine, making it roughly twice as potent with faster recovery and fewer cognitive side effects; its pain relief benefits are somewhat inconsistent.

=== Depression ===
In the US, esketamine (brand name Spravato) is a nasal spray approved for 2 types of depression: treatment-resistant depression (TRD) and major depressive disorder (MDD) associated with suicidal ideation or behavior in adults. Esketamine can be used on its own as a monotherapy, or prescribed alongside an oral antidepressant. Each esketamine nasal device delivers 2 sprays, containing a total of 20 mg of esketamine. treatment doses are typically 56 mg (2 devices) or 85 mg (3 devices).

Esketamine has modest short-term efficacy on TRD (similar in efficacy to atypical antipsychotics); there is limited long-term safety data available and some concerning signals regarding adverse events and abuse potential. Due to concerns about sedation, dissociation, and misuse, esketamine is available for treatment of depression only from certified providers through a restricted program under a Risk Evaluation and Mitigation Strategy (REMS) called Spravato REMS.

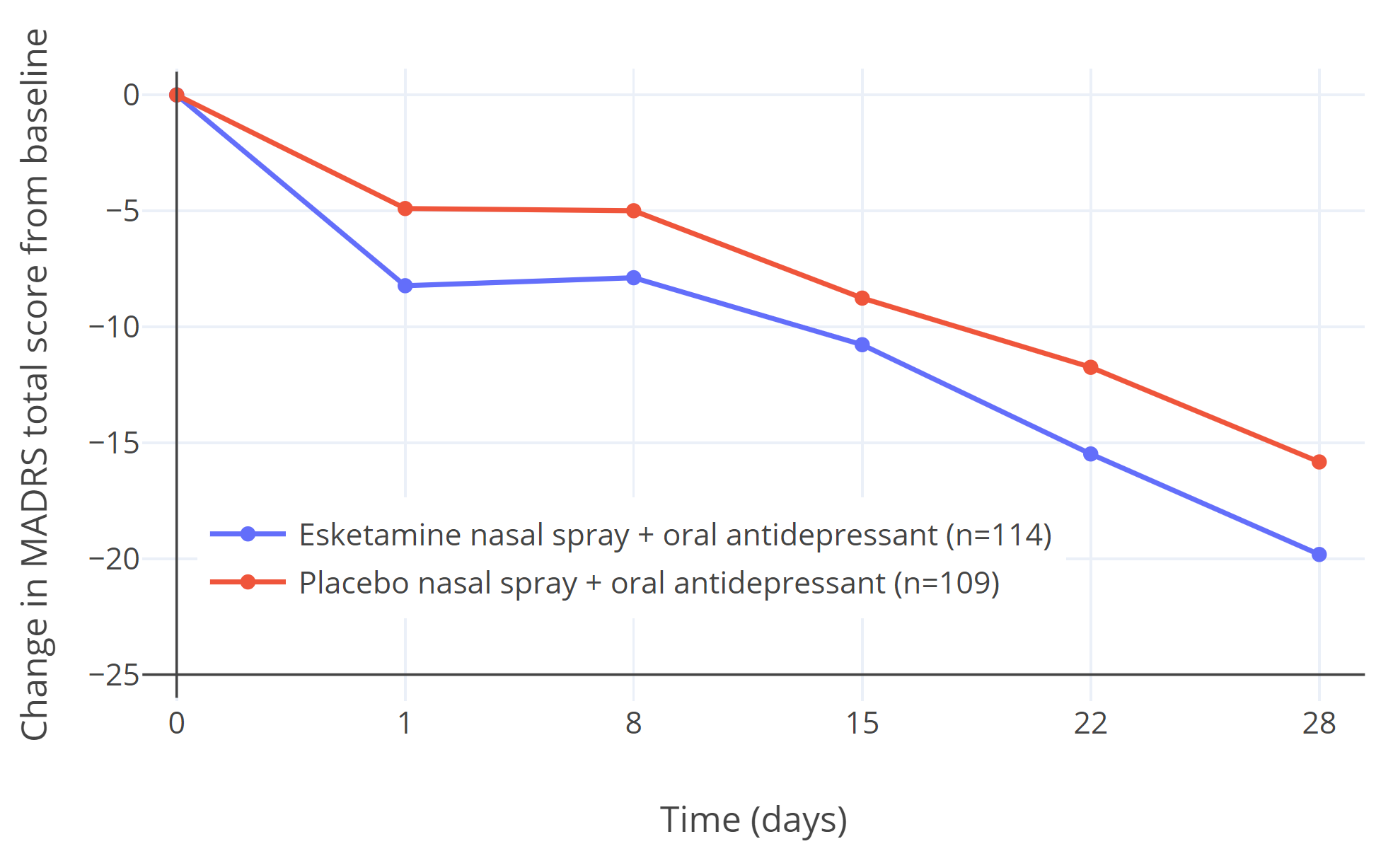
Short-term antidepressant efficacy (as measured by change in MADRS total score from baseline over 4 weeks) with esketamine nasal spray (56 or 84 mg) added to an existing oral antidepressant (n = 114) versus placebo nasal spray added to an existing oral antidepressant (n = 109) in people with treatment-resistant depression in the single positive efficacy trial. In two other short-term efficacy trials, esketamine was not superior to placebo.

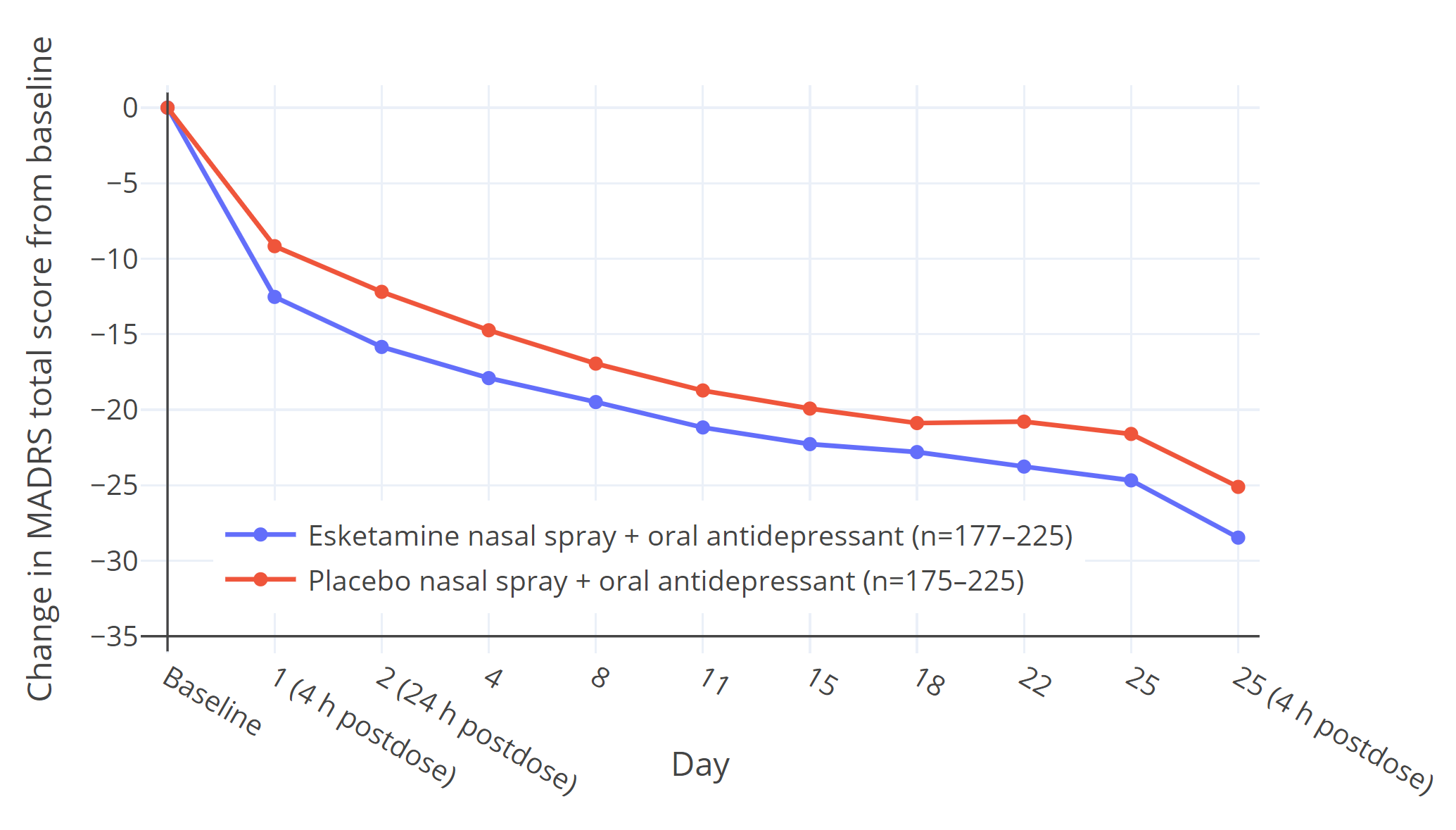
Short-term antidepressant efficacy (as measured by change in MADRS total score from baseline over 4 weeks) with esketamine nasal spray (84 mg twice weekly) added to an existing oral antidepressant (n = 177–225) versus placebo nasal spray added to an existing oral antidepressant (n = 175–225) in people with major depressive disorder and suicidality in one of the two positive efficacy trials. Findings were similar in the other positive short-term efficacy trial.

Expectations were initially very high for ketamine and esketamine for treatment of depression based on early small-scale clinical studies, with discovery of the rapid and ostensibly robust antidepressant effects of ketamine described by some authors as "the most important advance in the field of psychiatry in the past half century". According to a 2018 review, ketamine showed more than double the antidepressant effect size over placebo of conventional antidepressants in the treatment of depression based on the preliminary evidence available at the time (Cohen's d = 1.3–1.7 for ketamine, Cohen's d = 0.8 for midazolam (active placebo), and Cohen's d = 0.53–0.81 for conventional antidepressants). However, the efficacy of ketamine/esketamine for depression declined dramatically as studies became larger and more methodologically rigorous.

In February 2019, an outside panel of experts recommended in a 14–2 vote that the FDA approve the nasal spray version of esketamine for treatment-resistant depression, provided that it be given in a clinical setting, with people remaining on site for at least two hours after. The reasoning for this requirement is that trial participants temporarily experienced sedation, visual disturbances, trouble speaking, confusion, numbness, and feelings of dizziness immediately after. The approval of esketamine for treatment-resistant depression by the FDA was controversial due to limited and mixed evidence of efficacy and safety.

In January 2020, esketamine was rejected by the National Health Service (NHS) of Great Britain. The NHS questioned the benefits of the medication for depression and claimed that it was too expensive. People already using esketamine were allowed to complete treatment if their doctors considered this necessary.

Esketamine is approved in the United States for and shows promise as a rapid-acting monotherapy for treatment-resistant depression, but evidence is currently limited to a single trial. It is an effective and generally safe long-term treatment for adults with treatment-resistant depression, feasible in outpatient settings; optimal oral antidepressant combinations and predictive biomarkers need further research.

Spravato debuted at a cost of treatment of US$32,400 per year when it launched in the United States in March 2019. The Institute for Clinical and Economic Review (ICER), which evaluates cost effectiveness of drugs analogously to the National Institute for Health and Care Excellence (NICE) in the United Kingdom, declined to recommend esketamine for depression due to its steep cost and modest efficacy, deeming it not sufficiently cost-effective.

Esketamine is the second drug to be approved for treatment-resistant depression by the FDA, following olanzapine/fluoxetine (Symbyax) in 2009. Other agents, like the atypical antipsychotics aripiprazole (Abilify) and quetiapine (Seroquel), have been approved for use in the adjunctive therapy of major depressive disorder in people with a partial response to treatment.

In a meta-analysis conducted internally by the FDA during its evaluation of esketamine for treatment-resistant depression, the FDA reported a standardized mean difference (SMD) of esketamine for treatment-resistant depression of 0.28 using the three phase III short-term efficacy trials conducted by Janssen. This was similar to an SMD of 0.26 for olanzapine/fluoxetine for treatment-resistant depression and lower than SMDs of 0.35 for aripiprazole and 0.40 for quetiapine as adjuncts for major depressive disorder. These drugs are less expensive than esketamine and may serve as more affordable alternatives to it for depression with similar effectiveness. Both rTMS and intranasal esketamine are more effective than starting a new antidepressant for treatment-resistant depression, with rTMS potentially offering slightly greater or comparable symptom reduction compared to esketamine.

Racemic ketamine produces larger and more sustained antidepressant effects than esketamine, with higher doses generally more effective; both ketamine and esketamine have similar dropout rates.

Preliminary research suggests that arketamine, the R(−) enantiomer of ketamine, may also have its own independent antidepressant effects and may contribute to the antidepressant efficacy of racemic ketamine, but more research likewise is needed to evaluate this possibility.

== Adverse effects ==
The most common adverse effects of esketamine for depression (≥5% incidence) include dissociation, dizziness, sedation, nausea, vomiting, vertigo, numbness, anxiety, lethargy, increased blood pressure, and feelings of drunkenness. Long-term abuse of ketamine has been associated with bladder disease.

== Pharmacology ==
=== Pharmacodynamics ===
Esketamine is approximately twice as potent an anesthetic as racemic ketamine.

The possibility that arketamine may be more effective than esketamine has been suggested by some researchers.

Esketamine inhibits dopamine transporters eight times more than arketamine. This increases dopamine activity in the brain. At doses causing the same intensity of effects, esketamine is generally considered to be more pleasant by patients. Patients also generally recover mental function more quickly after being treated with pure esketamine, which may be a result of the fact that it is cleared from their system more quickly. However, this observation contrasts with findings that arketamine exhibits antidepressant effects without causing psychotomimetic side effects.

Unlike arketamine, esketamine does not bind significantly to sigma receptors. Esketamine increases glucose metabolism in the frontal cortex, while arketamine decreases glucose metabolism in the brain. This difference may be responsible for the fact that esketamine generally has a more dissociative or hallucinogenic effect while arketamine is reportedly more relaxing. However, another study found no difference between racemic ketamine and esketamine on the patient's level of vigilance. Interpretation of this finding is complicated by the fact that racemic ketamine is 50% esketamine.

=== Pharmacokinetics ===
Esketamine is eliminated from the human body more quickly than arketamine (R(–)-ketamine) or racemic ketamine, although arketamine slows the elimination of esketamine. The half-life of esketamine was found to be approximately 5 hours. When administered intranasally, esketamine's bioavailability is approximately 30–50%.

== Chemistry ==
Esketamine is the (S)-enantiomer of ketamine, which is a racemic mixture of esketamine and arketamine ((R)-ketamine).

== History ==
Esketamine was introduced for medical use as an anesthetic in Germany in 1997, and was subsequently marketed in other countries. In addition to its anesthetic effects, the medication showed properties of being a rapid-acting antidepressant, and was subsequently investigated for use as such. Esketamine received a breakthrough designation from the FDA for treatment-resistant depression (TRD) in 2013 and major depressive disorder (MDD) with accompanying suicidal ideation in 2016. In November 2017, it completed phase III clinical trials for treatment-resistant depression in the United States. Johnson & Johnson filed a Food and Drug Administration (FDA) New Drug Application (NDA) for approval on 4 September 2018; the application was endorsed by an FDA advisory panel on 12 February 2019, and on 5 March 2019, the FDA approved esketamine, in conjunction with an oral antidepressant, for the treatment of depression in adults. In August 2020, it was approved by the U.S. Food and Drug Administration (FDA) with the added indication for the short-term treatment of suicidal thoughts.

Since the 1980s, closely associated ketamine has been used as a club drug also known as "Special K" for its trip-inducing side effects.

== Society and culture ==
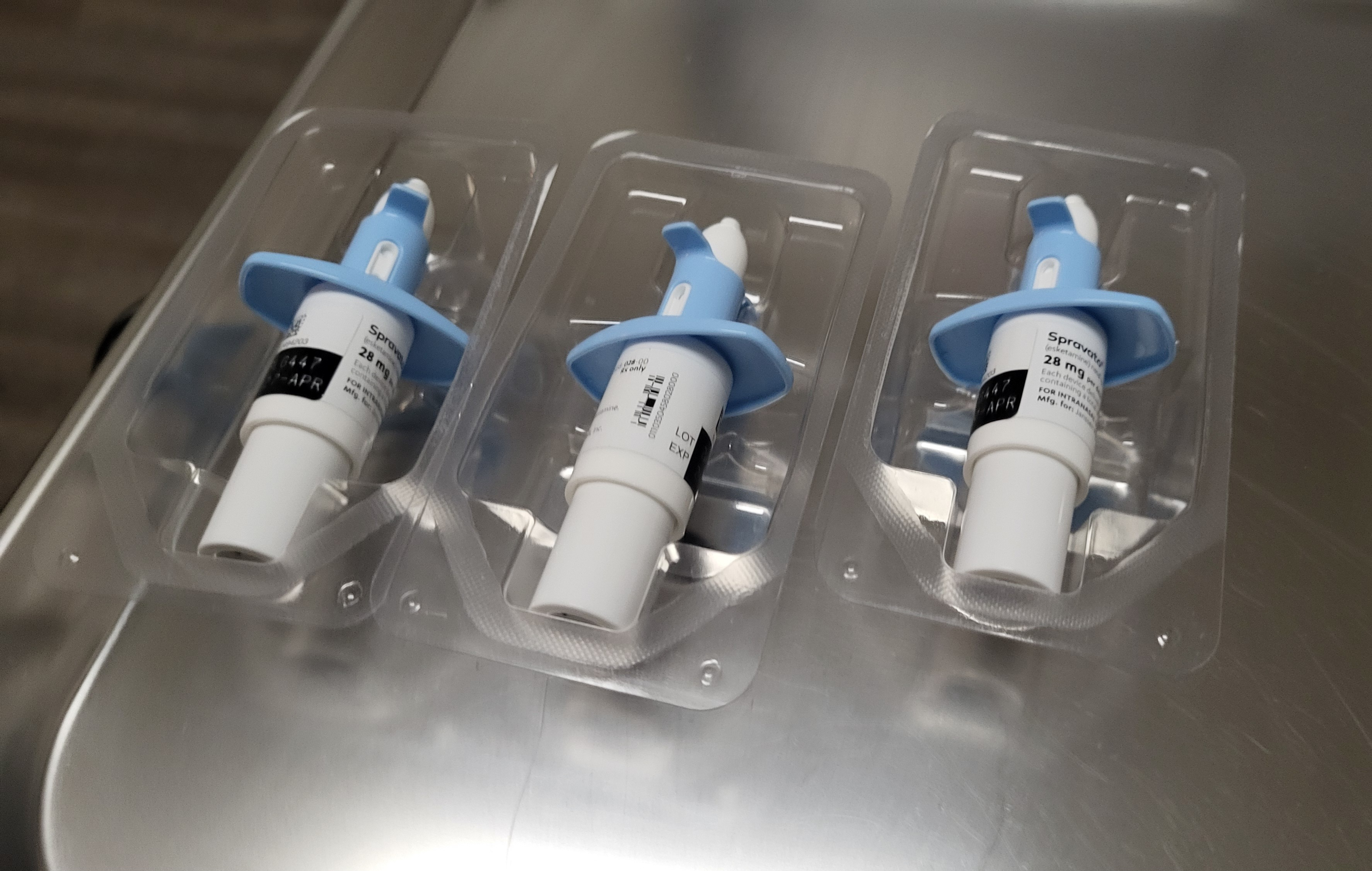
Spravato nasal spray

=== Names ===
Esketamine is the generic name of the drug and its INN and BAN, while esketamine hydrochloride is its BANM. It is also known as S(+)-ketamine, (S)-ketamine, or (–)-ketamine ((-)[+] ketamine), as well as by its developmental code name JNJ-54135419.

Esketamine is sold under the brand name Spravato for use as an antidepressant and the brand names Eskesia, Ketanest, Ketanest S, Ketanest-S, Keta-S for use as an anesthetic (veterinary), among others.

=== Controversy ===
The British critical psychiatrist Joanna Moncrieff has critiqued the use and study of esketamine and ketamine as well as related drugs like psychedelics for treatment of psychiatric disorders, highlighting concerns including excessive hype around these drugs, questionable biologically based theories of benefit, blurred lines between medical and recreational use, flawed clinical trial findings, financial conflicts of interest, strong expectancy effects and large placebo responses, small and short-term benefits over placebo, and their potential for difficult experiences and adverse effects, among others.

=== Legal status ===
Esketamine is a Schedule III controlled substance in the United States.

Esketamine is a controlled drug in the United Arab Emirates due to its potential for abuse, its use is only under strict medical supervision which is only available on government hospitals in the country, and its use only approved for treatment-resistant depression registered under the trademark Spravato.
