= Pain wind-up =

Perception of pain

Pain wind-up is the increase in pain intensity over time when a given stimulus is delivered repeatedly above a critical rate. It is caused by repeated stimulation of group C peripheral nerve fibers, leading to progressively increasing electrical response in the corresponding spinal cord (posterior horn) neurons due to priming of the NMDA receptor based response. It describes an exponentially progressive increase in firing of wide dynamic range neuron with repeated stimulation.
