= Risk Evaluation and Mitigation Strategies =

Program that monitors medications with a high potential for serious adverse effects

Risk Evaluation and Mitigation Strategies (REMS) is a program of the US Food and Drug Administration for the monitoring of medications with a high potential for serious adverse effects. REMS applies only to specific prescription drugs, but can apply to brand-name or generic drugs. The REMS program was formalized in 2007.

The FDA determines as part of the drug approval process that a REMS is necessary, and the drug company develops and maintains the individual program. REMS applies only to specific prescription drugs, but can apply to brand-name or generic drugs. REMS for generic drugs may be created in collaboration with the manufacturer of the brand-name drug. The FDA may remove the REMS requirement if it is found to not improve patient safety.

The REMS program developed out of previous systems dating back to the 1980s for monitoring the use of a small number of high-risk drugs such as isotretinoin, which causes serious birth defects; clozapine, which can cause agranulocytosis; and thalidomide, which is used to treat leprosy and certain cancers but causes serious birth defects. The 2007 Food and Drug Administration Amendments Act created section 505-1 of the Food, Drug, and Cosmetic Act, which allowed for the creation of the REMS program for applying individual monitoring restrictions to medications.

Some of the provisions required by the REMS program are training and certification of physicians allowed to prescribe the drug, requiring that the drug be administered in a hospital setting, requiring pharmacies to verify the status of patients receiving REMS drugs, requiring lab testing of patients to ensure that health status is satisfactory, or requiring that patients be entered into a registry.

== Usage ==
As of 2025, there are 74 medications subject to REMS monitoring.

91% of these include "elements to assure safe use". These typically require clinicians or healthcare institutions to become certified prior to prescribing. 9% include only a "communication plan" REMS element, which is informational in nature. These communication plans are typically composed of letters, websites, and fact sheets describing the specific safety risks identified in the REMS.

== Communication aspect ==
In 2020, clinical settings enrolled in the REMS program asked the FDA to make their reviews of REMS compliance public so that they can more easily view the records and adjust to feedback. Between 2014 and 2017, the FDA stated they did not have enough data to determine whether the REMS program was sufficiently preventing opioid abuse. The Health and Human Services Office of the Inspector General recommended that parties in the REMS program provide the FDA more data. The FDA was habitually late in evaluating that data, reportedly leaving those parties with inadequate time to react to the review before their next assessment. In November 2020, the FDA planned to create a "Summary of the REMS Assessment" document that would publicize their assessments of clinical settings and manufacturers in the REMS program. The FDA made a public request for comment on the idea of publishing the Summary of the REMS Assessment. Without the publication of the summary, parties in the REMS program must request it using the Freedom of Information Act.
