= Psychotomimetism =

Mechanism of psychoactive drugs mimicking the symptoms of psychosis

A drug with psychotomimetic (also known as psychomimetic or psychotogenic) actions mimics the symptoms of psychosis, including delusions and/or delirium, as opposed to only hallucinations. Psychotomimesis is the onset of psychotic symptoms following the administration of such a drug.

Some rarely used drugs of the opioid class have psychotomimetic effects. Particularly, mixed kappa receptor agonist mu receptor antagonist opioid analgesics can cause dose-related psychotomimesis. This adverse effect, incidence 1–2%, limits their use. Pentazocine and butorphanol fall under this opioid class.

There is evidence that cannabinoids are psychotomimetic, especially delta-9-tetrahydrocannabinol (Δ^{9}-THC). D'Souza et al. (2004) found that intravenous THC produced effects that resemble schizophrenia in both the positive symptoms (hallucinations, delusions, paranoia, and disorganized thinking) and negative symptoms (avolition, asociality, apathy, alogia, and anhedonia). Certain strains of cannabis may be more psychotomimetic than others, probably due to the action of cannabidiol (CBD), which inhibits P450 3A11's metabolic conversion of THC to 11-Hydroxy-THC, which is four times more psychoactive.^{p. 39}

Carl Sagan used the word "psychotomimetic" in his anonymous article "Mr.X" to describe the effects of cannabis, writing that "I smile, or sometimes even laugh out loud at the pictures on the insides of my eyelids. In this sense, I suppose cannabis is psychotomimetic, but I find none of the panic or terror that accompanies some psychoses."

Psychostimulants, such as cocaine, amphetamines, and synthetic cathinones (including bath salts) are known to produce psychotic symptoms similar to paranoid schizophrenia and manic-depressive psychosis.

Dissociative drugs (NMDA receptor antagonists) such as PCP also elicit psychotic behavior in its users which may result in medical intervention.

Deliriant drugs (muscarinic acetylcholine receptor antagonists) such as BZ (QNB) also fall into the class of psychotomimetics.

== List of psychotomimetic drugs ==
Substances that can induce psychotomimetic effects include:

- Alcohol (chronic/excessive use)
- Amphetamine
- Amylone
- Atropine
- Benzydamine
- Benzylpiperazine
- Bromocriptine
- Cathinone
- Cocaine
- Cyclazocine
- Dextromethorphan (DXM)
- Dimethyltryptamine (DMT)
- Diphenhydramine (DPH)
- Doxylamine
- Efavirenz
- Enadoline
- Ephedrine
- Ergine
- Ethylone
- Ibogaine
- Inhalants
- Ketamine
- Ketazocine
- Levorphanol
- Lysergic acid diethylamide (LSD)
- Meperidine
- Mephedrone
- Mescaline
- Methamphetamine
- Methcathinone
- Methorphan
- Methoxetamine (MXE)
- Methylenedioxyamphetamine (MDA)
- Methylenedioxymethamphetamine (MDMA)
- Methylenedioxy-N-ethylamphetamine (MDEA)
- Methylenedioxypyrovalerone (MDPV)
- Methylone
- Montelukast
- Myristicin
- N-Ethylpentylone
- Pentazocine
- Phencyclidine (PCP)
- Phentermine
- Pramipexole
- Prolintane
- Prolintanone
- Propylhexedrine
- Psilocybin
- Pyrovalerone
- Quinuclidinyl benzilate (QNB)
- Rotigotine
- Salvinorin A
- Scopolamine
- Synthetic cannabinoids
- Tetrahydrocannabinol (THC)
- Trihexyphenidyl

== See also ==
- Amphetamines
- Anticholinergics
- Antidepressants
- Antihistamines
- Antipsychotics
- Anxiogenics
- Anxiolytics
- Cannabinoids
- Cathinones
- Deliriants
- Depressants
- Depressogens
- Designer drugs
- Dissociatives
- Hallucinogens
- Hypnotics
- Narcotics
- Opioids
- Phenidates
- Psychedelics
- Sedatives
- Stimulants
