= Enantioselective synthesis =

Chemical reaction(s) which favor one chiral isomer over another

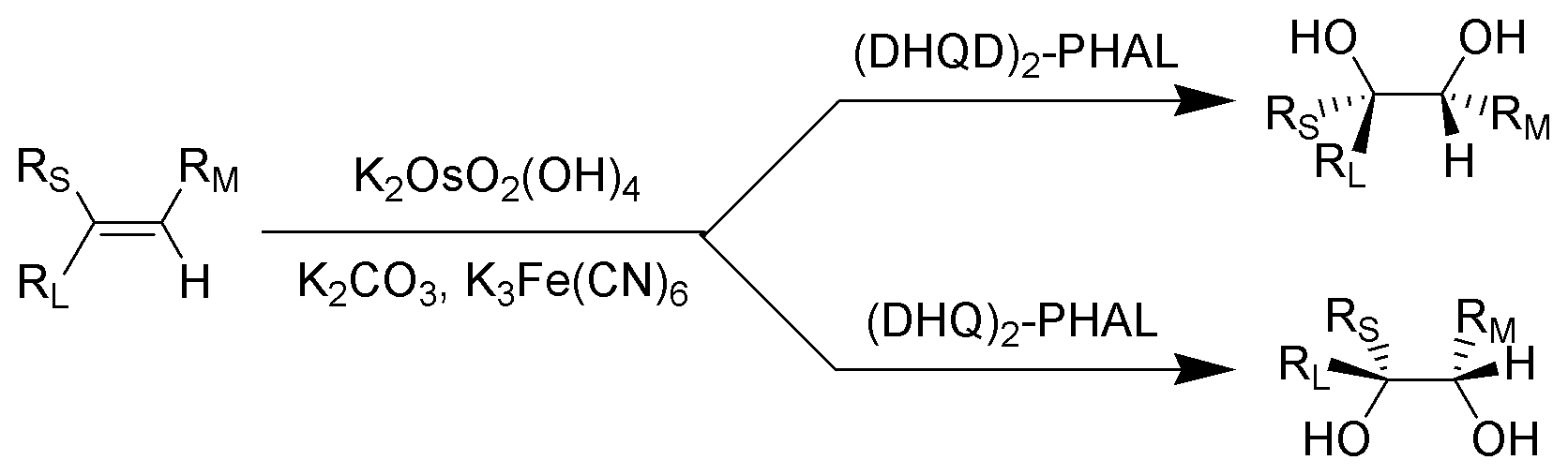
In the Sharpless dihydroxylation reaction the chirality of the product can be controlled by the "AD-mix" used. This is an example of enantioselective synthesis using asymmetric induction Key: R_{L} = Largest substituent; R_{M} = Medium-sized substituent; R_{S} = Smallest substituent

Two enantiomers of a generic alpha amino acid Carbon at the chiral center Carboxylic acid group R group Hydrogen

Enantioselective synthesis, also called asymmetric synthesis, is a form of chemical synthesis. It is defined by IUPAC as "a chemical reaction (or reaction sequence) in which one or more new elements of chirality are formed in a substrate molecule and which produces the stereoisomeric products in unequal amounts." That is, it is the synthesis of a chemical by a method that favors the formation of a specific stereoisomer among several possibilities.

Enantioselective synthesis is a key process in modern chemistry and is particularly important in the field of pharmaceuticals, as the different enantiomers or diastereomers of a structure often have different biological activity.

== Overview ==
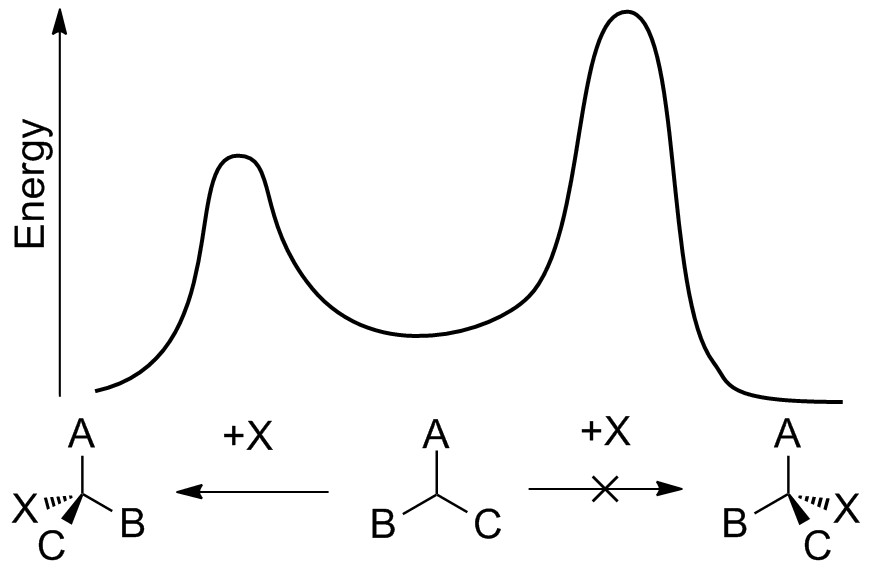
An energy profile of an enantioselective addition reaction.

Many of the building blocks of biological systems such as sugars and amino acids are produced exclusively as one enantiomer. As a result, living systems possess a high degree of chemical chirality and will often react differently with the various enantiomers of a given compound. Examples of this selectivity include:

- Flavour: the artificial sweetener aspartame has two enantiomers. L-aspartame tastes sweet whereas D-aspartame is tasteless.
- Odor: R-(–)-carvone smells like spearmint whereas S-(+)-carvone smells like caraway.
- Drug effectiveness: the antidepressant drug Citalopram is sold as a racemic mixture. However, studies have shown that only the (S)-(+) enantiomer is responsible for the drug's beneficial effects.
- Drug safety: D‑penicillamine is used in chelation therapy and for the treatment of rheumatoid arthritis whereas L‑penicillamine is toxic as it inhibits the action of pyridoxine, an essential B vitamin.

As such enantioselective synthesis is of great importance but it can also be difficult to achieve. Enantiomers possess identical enthalpies and entropies and hence should be produced in equal amounts by an undirected process – leading to a racemic mixture. Enantioselective synthesis can be achieved by using a chiral feature that favors the formation of one enantiomer over another through interactions at the transition state. This biasing is known as asymmetric induction and can involve chiral features in the substrate, reagent, catalyst, or environment and works by making the activation energy required to form one enantiomer lower than that of the opposing enantiomer.

Enantioselectivity is usually determined by the relative rates of an enantiodifferentiating step—the point at which one reactant can become either of two enantiomeric products. The rate constant, k, for a reaction is the function of the activation energy of the reaction, sometimes called the energy barrier, and is temperature-dependent. Using the Gibbs free energy of the energy barrier, ΔG*, means that the relative rates for opposing stereochemical outcomes at a given temperature, T, is:

$$\frac{k_1}{k_2} = 10^\frac{\Delta \Delta G^*}{T \times 1.98 \times 2.3}$$

This temperature dependence means the rate difference, and therefore the enantioselectivity, is greater at lower temperatures. As a result, even small energy-barrier differences can lead to a noticeable effect.

ΔΔG* (kcal)	k_{1}/k_{2} at 273 K		k_{1}/k_{2} at 298 K		k_{1}/k_{2} at 323 K)	
1.0	6	.37	5	.46	4	.78
2.0	40	.6	29	.8	22	.9
3.0	259		162		109	
4.0	1650		886		524	
5.0	10500		4830		2510	

== Approaches ==
=== Enantioselective catalysis ===
Enantioselective catalysis (known traditionally as "asymmetric catalysis") is performed using chiral catalysts, which are typically chiral coordination complexes. Catalysis is effective for a broader range of transformations than any other method of enantioselective synthesis. The chiral metal catalysts are almost invariably rendered chiral by using chiral ligands, but it is possible to generate chiral-at-metal complexes composed entirely of achiral ligands. Most enantioselective catalysts are effective at low substrate/catalyst ratios. Given their high efficiencies, they are often suitable for industrial scale synthesis, even with expensive catalysts. A versatile example of enantioselective synthesis is asymmetric hydrogenation, which is used to reduce a wide variety of functional groups.

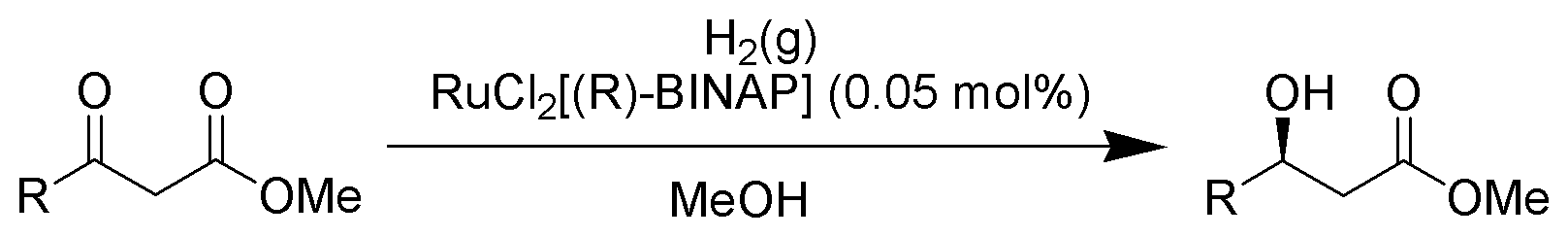

The design of new catalysts is dominated by the development of new classes of ligands. Certain ligands, often referred to as "privileged ligands", are effective in a wide range of reactions; examples include BINOL, Salen, and BOX. Most catalysts are effective for only one type of asymmetric reaction. For example, Noyori asymmetric hydrogenation with BINAP/Ru requires a β-ketone, although another catalyst, BINAP/diamine-Ru, widens the scope to α,β-alkenes and aromatic chemicals.

=== Chiral auxiliaries ===
A chiral auxiliary is an organic compound which couples to the starting material to form a new compound which can then undergo diastereoselective reactions via intramolecular asymmetric induction. At the end of the reaction the auxiliary is removed, under conditions that will not cause racemization of the product. It is typically then recovered for future use.

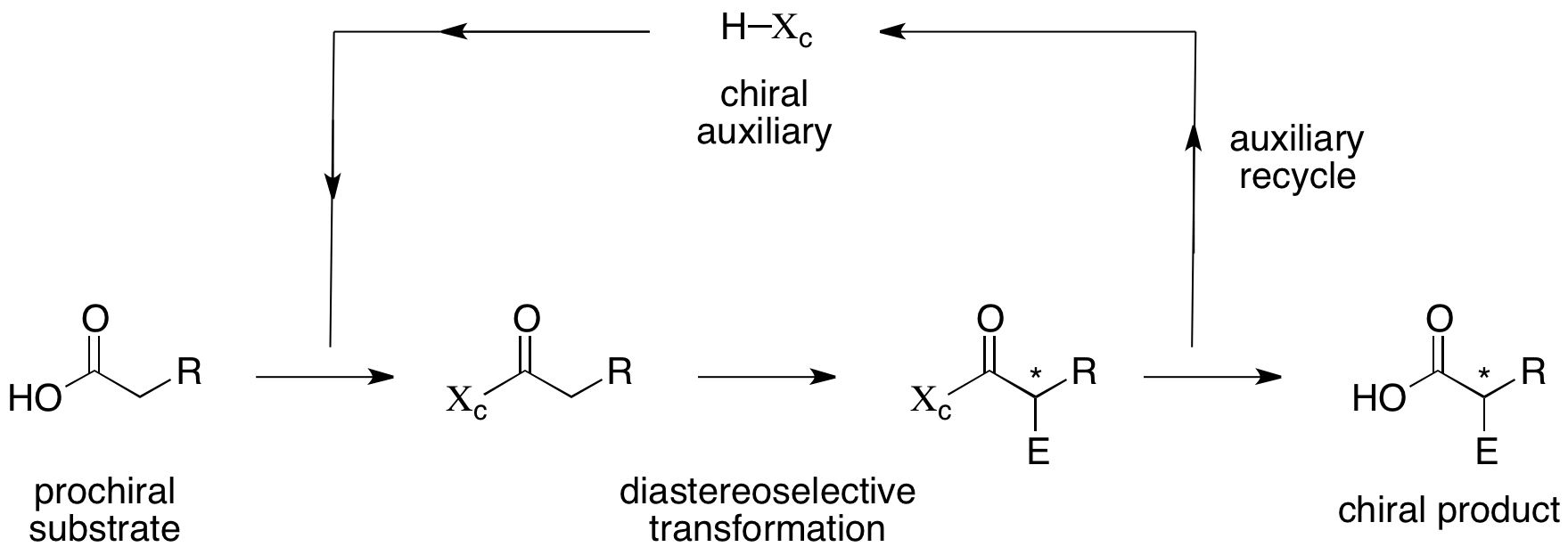

Chiral auxiliaries must be used in stoichiometric amounts to be effective and require additional synthetic steps to append and remove the auxiliary. However, in some cases the only available stereoselective methodology relies on chiral auxiliaries and these reactions tend to be versatile and very well-studied, allowing the most time-efficient access to enantiomerically pure products. Additionally, the products of auxiliary-directed reactions are diastereomers, which enables their facile separation by methods such as column chromatography or crystallization.

=== Biocatalysis ===
Biocatalysis makes use of biological compounds, ranging from isolated enzymes to living cells, to perform chemical transformations. The advantages of these reagents include very high e.e.s and reagent specificity, as well as mild operating conditions and low environmental impact. Biocatalysts are more commonly used in industry than in academic research; for example in the production of statins. The high reagent specificity can be a problem, however, as it often requires that a wide range of biocatalysts be screened before an effective reagent is found.

=== Enantioselective organocatalysis ===
Organocatalysis refers to a form of catalysis, where the rate of a chemical reaction is increased by an organic compound consisting of carbon, hydrogen, sulfur and other non-metal elements. When the organocatalyst is chiral, then enantioselective synthesis can be achieved; for example a number of carbon–carbon bond forming reactions become enantioselective in the presence of proline with the aldol reaction being a prime example. Organocatalysis often employs natural compounds and secondary amines as chiral catalysts; these are inexpensive and environmentally friendly, as no metals are involved.

=== Chiral pool synthesis ===
Chiral pool synthesis is one of the simplest and oldest approaches for enantioselective synthesis. A readily available chiral starting material is manipulated through successive reactions, often using achiral reagents, to obtain the desired target molecule. This can meet the criteria for enantioselective synthesis when a new chiral species is created, such as in an S_{N}2 reaction.

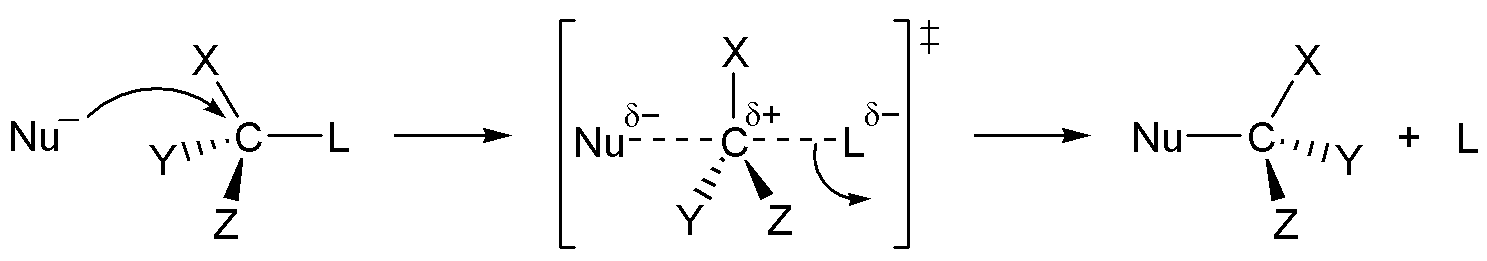

Chiral pool synthesis is especially attractive for target molecules having similar chirality to a relatively inexpensive naturally occurring building-block such as a sugar or amino acid. However, the number of possible reactions the molecule can undergo is restricted and tortuous synthetic routes may be required (e.g. Oseltamivir total synthesis). This approach also requires a stoichiometric amount of the enantiopure starting material, which can be expensive if it is not naturally occurring.

== Separation and analysis of enantiomers ==
The two enantiomers of a molecule possess many of the same physical properties (e.g. melting point, boiling point, polarity etc.) and so behave identically to each other. As a result, they will migrate with an identical R_{f} in thin layer chromatography and have identical retention times in HPLC and GC. Their NMR and IR spectra are identical.

This can make it very difficult to determine whether a process has produced a single enantiomer (and crucially which enantiomer it is) as well as making it hard to separate enantiomers from a reaction which has not been 100% enantioselective. Fortunately, enantiomers behave differently in the presence of other chiral materials and this can be exploited to allow their separation and analysis.

Enantiomers do not migrate identically on chiral chromatographic media, such as quartz or standard media that has been chirally modified. This forms the basis of chiral column chromatography, which can be used on a small scale to allow analysis via GC and HPLC, or on a large scale to separate chirally impure materials. However this process can require large amount of chiral packing material which can be expensive. A common alternative is to use a chiral derivatizing agent to convert the enantiomers into a diastereomers, in much the same way as chiral auxiliaries. These have different physical properties and hence can be separated and analysed using conventional methods. Special chiral derivitizing agents known as 'chiral resolution agents' are used in the NMR spectroscopy of stereoisomers, these typically involve coordination to chiral europium complexes such as Eu(fod)_{3} and Eu(hfc)_{3}.

The separation and analysis of component enantiomers of a racemic drugs or pharmaceutical substances are referred to as chiral analysis. or enantioselective analysis. The most frequently employed technique to carry out chiral analysis involves separation science procedures, specifically chiral chromatographic methods.

The enantiomeric excess of a substance can also be determined using certain optical methods. The oldest method for doing this is to use a polarimeter to compare the level of optical rotation in the product against a 'standard' of known composition. It is also possible to perform ultraviolet-visible spectroscopy of stereoisomers by exploiting the Cotton effect.

One of the most accurate ways of determining the chirality of compound is to determine its absolute configuration by X-ray crystallography. However this is a labour-intensive process which requires that a suitable single crystal be grown.

== History ==
=== Inception (1815–1905) ===
In 1815 the French physicist Jean-Baptiste Biot showed that certain chemicals could rotate the plane of a beam of polarised light, a property called optical activity. The nature of this property remained a mystery until 1848, when Louis Pasteur proposed that it had a molecular basis originating from some form of dissymmetry, with the term chirality being coined by Lord Kelvin a year later. The origin of chirality itself was finally described in 1874, when Jacobus Henricus van 't Hoff and Joseph Le Bel independently proposed the tetrahedral geometry of carbon. Structural models prior to this work had been two-dimensional, and van 't Hoff and Le Bel theorized that the arrangement of groups around this tetrahedron could dictate the optical activity of the resulting compound through what became known as the Le Bel–van 't Hoff rule.

Marckwald's brucine-catalyzed enantioselective decarboxylation of 2-ethyl-2-methylmalonic acid, resulting in a slight excess of the levorotary form of the 2-methylbutyric acid product.

In 1894 Hermann Emil Fischer outlined the concept of asymmetric induction; in which he correctly ascribed selective the formation of D-glucose by plants to be due to the influence of optically active substances within chlorophyll. Fischer also successfully performed what would now be regarded as the first example of enantioselective synthesis, by enantioselectively elongating sugars via a process which would eventually become the Kiliani–Fischer synthesis.

Brucine, an alkaloid natural product related to strychnine, used successfully as an organocatalyst by Marckwald in 1904.

The first enantioselective chemical synthesis is most often attributed to Willy Marckwald, Universität zu Berlin, for a brucine-catalyzed enantioselective decarboxylation of 2-ethyl-2-methylmalonic acid reported in 1904. A slight excess of the levorotary form of the product of the reaction, 2-methylbutyric acid, was produced; as this product is also a natural product—e.g., as a side chain of lovastatin formed by its diketide synthase (LovF) during its biosynthesis—this result constitutes the first recorded total synthesis with enantioselectivity, as well other firsts (as Koskinen notes, first "example of asymmetric catalysis, enantiotopic selection, and organocatalysis"). This observation is also of historical significance, as at the time enantioselective synthesis could only be understood in terms of vitalism. At the time many prominent chemists such as Jöns Jacob Berzelius argued that natural and artificial compounds were fundamentally different and that chirality was simply a manifestation of the 'vital force' which could only exist in natural compounds. Unlike Fischer, Marckwald had performed an enantioselective reaction upon an achiral, un-natural starting material, albeit with a chiral organocatalyst (as we now understand this chemistry).

=== Early work (1905–1965) ===
The development of enantioselective synthesis was initially slow, largely due to the limited range of techniques available for their separation and analysis. Diastereomers possess different physical properties, allowing separation by conventional means, however at the time enantiomers could only be separated by spontaneous resolution (where enantiomers separate upon crystallisation) or kinetic resolution (where one enantiomer is selectively destroyed). The only tool for analysing enantiomers was optical activity using a polarimeter, a method which provides no structural data.

It was not until the 1950s that major progress really began. Driven in part by chemists such as R. B. Woodward and Vladimir Prelog but also by the development of new techniques. The first of these was X-ray crystallography, which was used to determine the absolute configuration of an organic compound by Johannes Bijvoet in 1951. Chiral chromatography was introduced a year later by Dalgliesh, who used paper chromatography to separate chiral amino acids. Although Dalgliesh was not the first to observe such separations, he correctly attributed the separation of enantiomers to differential retention by the chiral cellulose. This was expanded upon in 1960, when Klem and Reed first reported the use of chirally-modified silica gel for chiral HPLC separation.

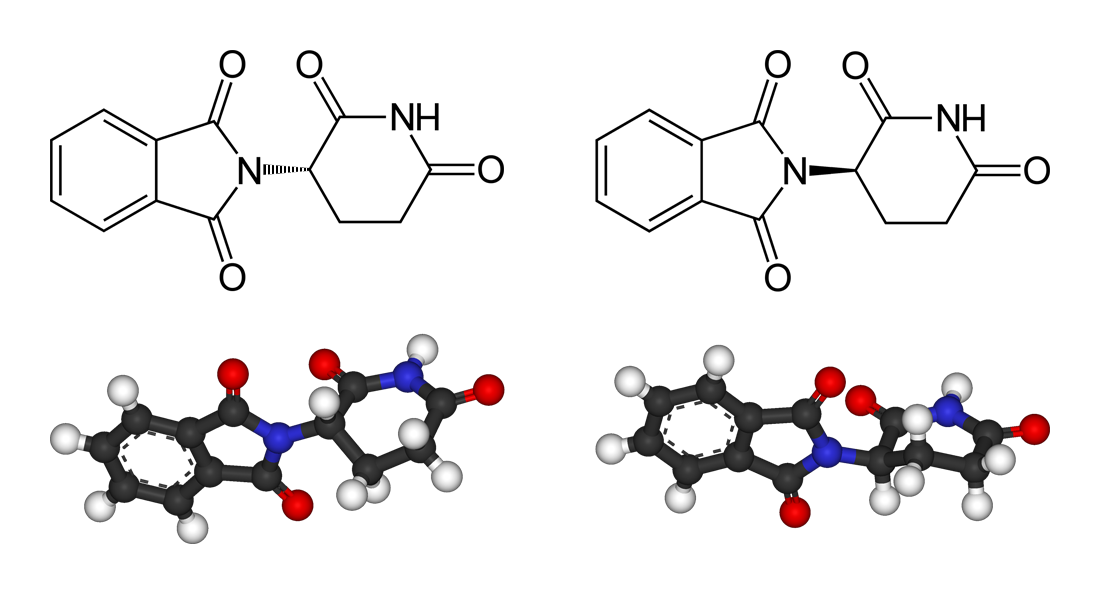
The two enantiomers of thalidomide: Left: (S)-thalidomide Right: (R)-thalidomide

==== Thalidomide ====
While it was known that the different enantiomers of a drug could have different activities, with significant early work being done by Arthur Robertson Cushny, this was not accounted for in early drug design and testing. However, following the thalidomide disaster the development and licensing of drugs changed dramatically.

First synthesized in 1953, thalidomide was widely prescribed for morning sickness from 1957 to 1962, but was soon found to be seriously teratogenic, eventually causing birth defects in more than 10,000 babies. The disaster prompted many countries to introduce tougher rules for the testing and licensing of drugs, such as the Kefauver-Harris Amendment (US) and Directive 65/65/EEC1 (EU).

Early research into the teratogenic mechanism, using mice, suggested that one enantiomer of thalidomide was teratogenic while the other possessed all the therapeutic activity. This theory was later shown to be incorrect and has now been superseded by a body of research. However it raised the importance of chirality in drug design, leading to increased research into enantioselective synthesis.

=== Modern age (since 1965) ===
The Cahn–Ingold–Prelog priority rules (often abbreviated as the CIP system) were first published in 1966; allowing enantiomers to be more easily and accurately described. The same year saw first successful enantiomeric separation by gas chromatography an important development as the technology was in common use at the time.

Metal-catalysed enantioselective synthesis was pioneered by William S. Knowles, Ryōji Noyori and K. Barry Sharpless; for which they would receive the 2001 Nobel Prize in Chemistry. Knowles and Noyori began with the development of asymmetric hydrogenation, which they developed independently in 1968. Knowles replaced the achiral triphenylphosphine ligands in Wilkinson's catalyst with chiral phosphine ligands. This experimental catalyst was employed in an asymmetric hydrogenation with a modest 15% enantiomeric excess. Knowles was also the first to apply enantioselective metal catalysis to industrial-scale synthesis; while working for the Monsanto Company he developed an enantioselective hydrogenation step for the production of L-DOPA, utilising the DIPAMP ligand.

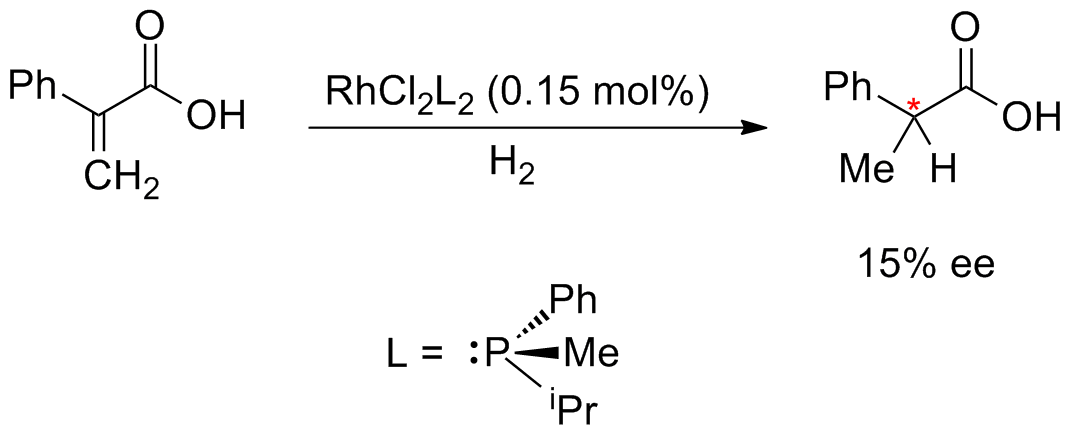
Knowles: Asymmetric hydrogenation (1968)

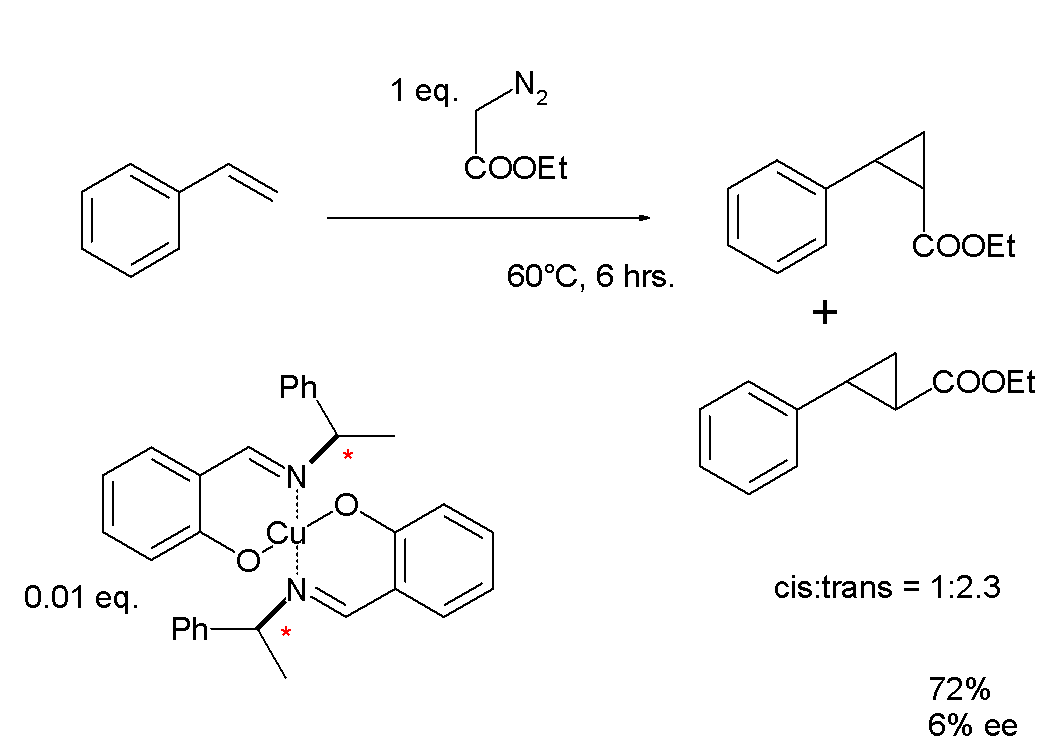
Noyori: Enantioselective cyclopropanation (1968)

Noyori devised a copper complex using a chiral Schiff base ligand, which he used for the metal–carbenoid cyclopropanation of styrene. In common with Knowles' findings, Noyori's results for the enantiomeric excess for this first-generation ligand were disappointingly low: 6%. However continued research eventually led to the development of the Noyori asymmetric hydrogenation reaction.

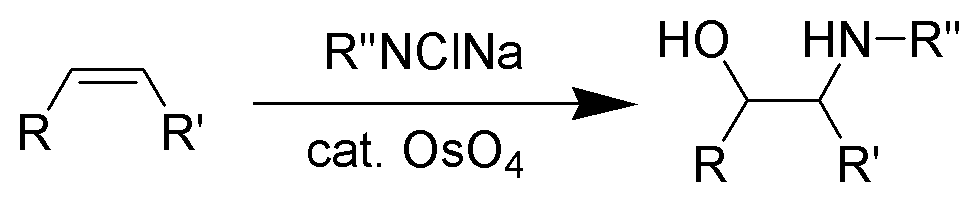
The Sharpless oxyamination

Sharpless complemented these reduction reactions by developing a range of asymmetric oxidations (Sharpless epoxidation, Sharpless asymmetric dihydroxylation, Sharpless oxyamination) during the 1970s and 1980s. With the asymmetric oxyamination reaction, using osmium tetroxide, being the earliest.

During the same period, methods were developed to allow the analysis of chiral compounds by NMR; either using chiral derivatizing agents, such as Mosher's acid, or europium based shift reagents, of which Eu(DPM)_{3} was the earliest.

Chiral auxiliaries were introduced by E.J. Corey in 1978 and featured prominently in the work of Dieter Enders. Around the same time enantioselective organocatalysis was developed, with pioneering work including the Hajos–Parrish–Eder–Sauer–Wiechert reaction. Enzyme-catalyzed enantioselective reactions became more and more common during the 1980s, particularly in industry, with their applications including asymmetric ester hydrolysis with pig-liver esterase. The emerging technology of genetic engineering has allowed the tailoring of enzymes to specific processes, permitting an increased range of selective transformations. For example, in the asymmetric hydrogenation of statin precursors.

== See also ==
- Aza-Baylis–Hillman reaction, for the use of a chiral ionic liquid in enantioselective synthesis
- Kelliphite, a chiral ligand widely used in asymmetric synthesis
- Spontaneous absolute asymmetric synthesis, the synthesis of chiral products from achiral precursors and without the use of optically active catalysts or auxiliaries. It is relevant to the discussion homochirality in nature.
- Tacticity, a property of polymers which originates from enantioselective synthesis
- Chiral analysis
- Enantioselective analysis
