= Nuclear magnetic resonance spectroscopy of stereoisomers =

Chemical analysis method

Nuclear magnetic resonance spectroscopy of stereoisomers most commonly known as NMR spectroscopy of stereoisomers is a chemical analysis method that uses NMR spectroscopy to determine the absolute configuration of stereoisomers. For example, the cis or trans alkenes, R or S enantiomers, and R,R or R,S diastereomers.

In a mixture of enantiomers, these methods can help quantify the optical purity by integrating the area under the NMR peak corresponding to each stereoisomer. Accuracy of integration can be improved by inserting a chiral derivatizing agent with a nucleus other than hydrogen or carbon, then reading the heteronuclear NMR spectrum: for example fluorine-19 NMR or phosphorus-31 NMR. Mosher's acid contains a -CF_{3} group, so if the adduct has no other fluorine atoms, the ^{19}F NMR of a racemic mixture shows just two peaks, one for each stereoisomer.

As with NMR spectroscopy in general, good resolution requires a high signal-to-noise ratio, clear separation between peaks for each stereoisomer, and narrow line width for each peak. Chiral lanthanide shift reagents cause a clear separation of chemical shift, but they must be used in low concentrations to avoid line broadening.

== Methods ==
- Karplus equation
- Chiral derivatizing agent
  - Mosher's acid
  - Chiral solvating agent
  - Chiral lanthanide shift reagent (e.g. Eufod)
- NMR database method

== See also ==
- Ultraviolet-visible spectroscopy of stereoisomers
