= NMR database =

NMR database (NMR = nuclear magnetic resonance) may refer to:

- Nuclear magnetic resonance spectra database, a collection of NMR spectra for a large number of compounds
- Nuclear magnetic resonance database method, a strategy to identify the stereochemistry of certain chiral compounds
