= Charles Wurster =

Charles Wurster may refer to:

- Charles D. Wurster, United States Coast Guard admiral
- Charles Frederick Wurster (1930–2023), American biochemist and environmental activist
