= TRISPHAT =

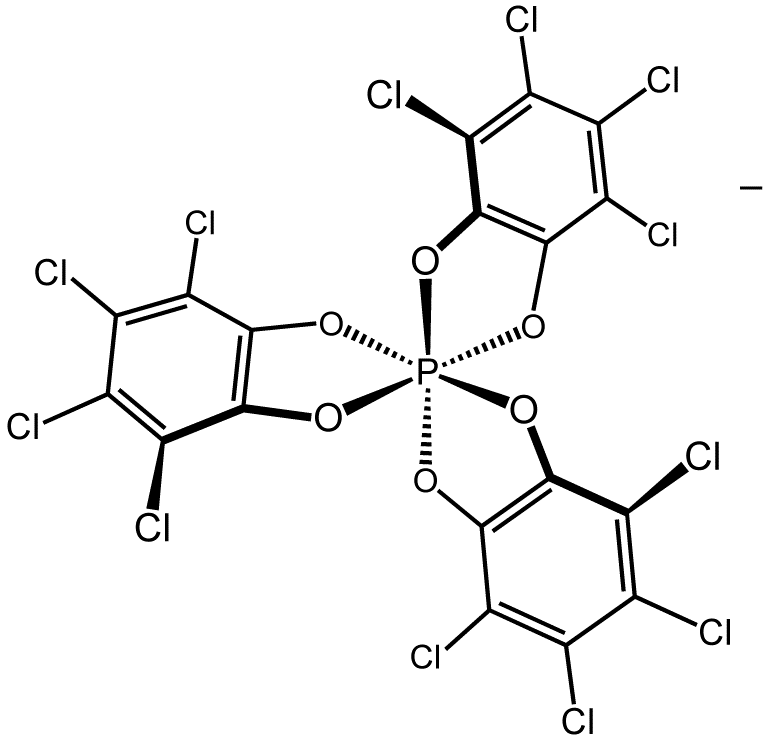

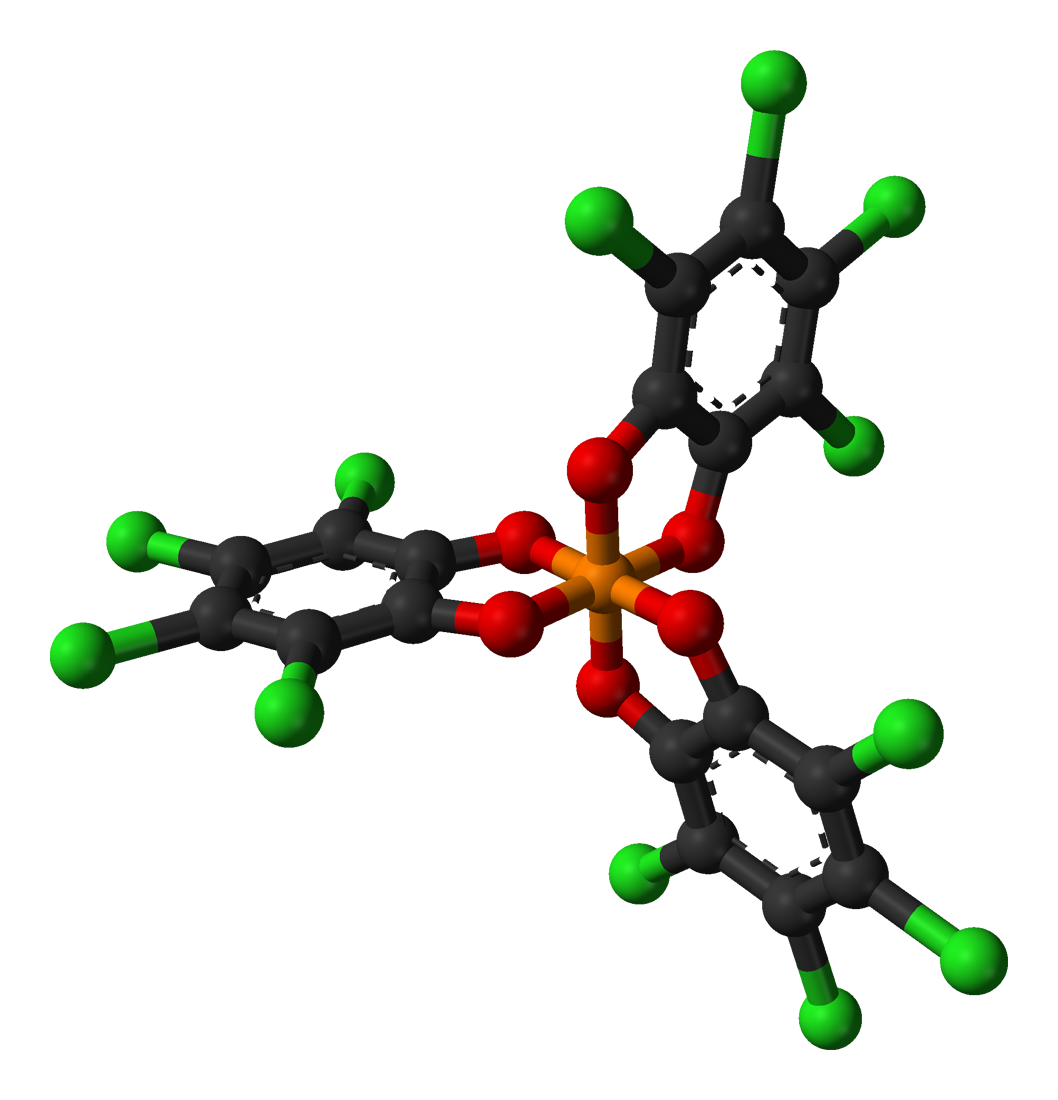

Names
- IUPAC name Tetrabutylammonium tris(3,4,5,6-tetrachlorobenzene-1,2-diolato-κ^{2}O^{1},O^{2})phosphorus(V)
- Other names Tetrabutylammonium tris(tetrachlorocatecholato)phosphorus(1−); Bu_{4}N^{+} PHAT^{−} 1-Butanaminium, N,N,N-tributyl-, (OC-6-11-Δ)-tris[3,4,5,6-tetrachloro-1,2-benzenediolato(2−)-κO^{1},κO^{2}]phosphate(1−) (1:1)

Identifiers
CAS Number	tetrabutylammonium salt:: 301687-57-0
3D model (JSmol)	Interactive image; tributylammonium salt:: Interactive image; tetrabutylammonium salt:: Interactive image
ChemSpider	tetrabutylammonium salt:: 35467078
EC Number	tetrabutylammonium salt:: 636-891-3
PubChem CID	tetrabutylammonium salt:: 71310446
CompTox Dashboard (EPA)	tetrabutylammonium salt:: DTXSID80746191
- InChI: tetrabutylammonium salt:: InChI=1S/C18Cl12O6P.C16H36N/c19-1-2(20)8(26)14-13(7(1)25)31-37(32-14,33-15-9(27)3(21)4(22)10(28)16(15)34-37)35-17-11(29)5(23)6(24)12(30)18(17)36-37;1-5-9-13-17(14-10-6-2,15-11-7-3)16-12-8-4/h;5-16H2,1-4H3/q-1;+1 Key: GCGVBYHPNKLLAV-UHFFFAOYSA-N
- SMILES: O1c0c(Cl)c(Cl)c(Cl)c(Cl)c0O[P-]123(Oc0c(Cl)c(Cl)c(Cl)c(Cl)c0O2)Oc0c(Cl)c(Cl)c(Cl)c(Cl)c0O3; tributylammonium salt:: O1c0c(Cl)c(Cl)c(Cl)c(Cl)c0O[P-]123(Oc0c(Cl)c(Cl)c(Cl)c(Cl)c0O2)Oc0c(Cl)c(Cl)c(Cl)c(Cl)c0O3.CCCC[N+H](CCCC)CCCC; tetrabutylammonium salt:: CCCC[N+](CCCC)(CCCC)CCCC.C12=C(C(=C(C(=C1Cl)Cl)Cl)Cl)O[P-]34(O2)(OC5=C(O3)C(=C(C(=C5Cl)Cl)Cl)Cl)OC6=C(O4)C(=C(C(=C6Cl)Cl)Cl)Cl

Properties
Chemical formula	[C_{16}H_{36}N][C_{18}Cl_{12}O_{6}P]
Molar mass	1011.06
Appearance	colourless solid
Solubility in water	CH_{2}Cl_{2}
- Except where otherwise noted, data are given for materials in their standard state (at 25 °C [77 °F], 100 kPa). verify (what is ?) Infobox references

TRISPHAT (full name tris(tetrachlorocatecholato)phosphate(1−)) is an inorganic anion with the formula P(O_{2}C_{6}Cl_{4})^{3−}, often prepared as the tributylammonium ((C_{4}H_{9})_{3}NH^{+}) or tetrabutylammonium ((C_{4}H_{9})_{4}N^{+}) salt. The anion features phosphorus(V) bonded to three tetrachlorocatecholate (C_{6}Cl_{4}O^{2−}_{2}) ligands. This anion can be resolved into the axially chiral enantiomers, which are optically stable (the picture shows the Δ enantiomer).

The TRISPHAT anion has been used as a chiral shift reagent for cations. It improves the resolution of ^{1}H NMR spectra by forming diastereomeric ion pairs.

== Preparation ==
The TRISPHAT-containing salt is prepared by treatment of phosphorus pentachloride with tetrachlorocatechol followed by an addition of a tertiary amine:

PCl_{5} + 3 C_{6}Cl_{4}(OH)_{2} → H[P(O_{2}C_{6}Cl_{4})_{3}] + 5 HCl
H[P(O_{2}C_{6}Cl_{4})_{3}] + Bu_{3}N → Bu_{3}NH^{+}[P(O_{2}C_{6}Cl_{4})_{3}]^{−}

Using a chiral amine, the anion can be readily resolved.
