= Willy Marckwald =

German chemist (1864–1942)

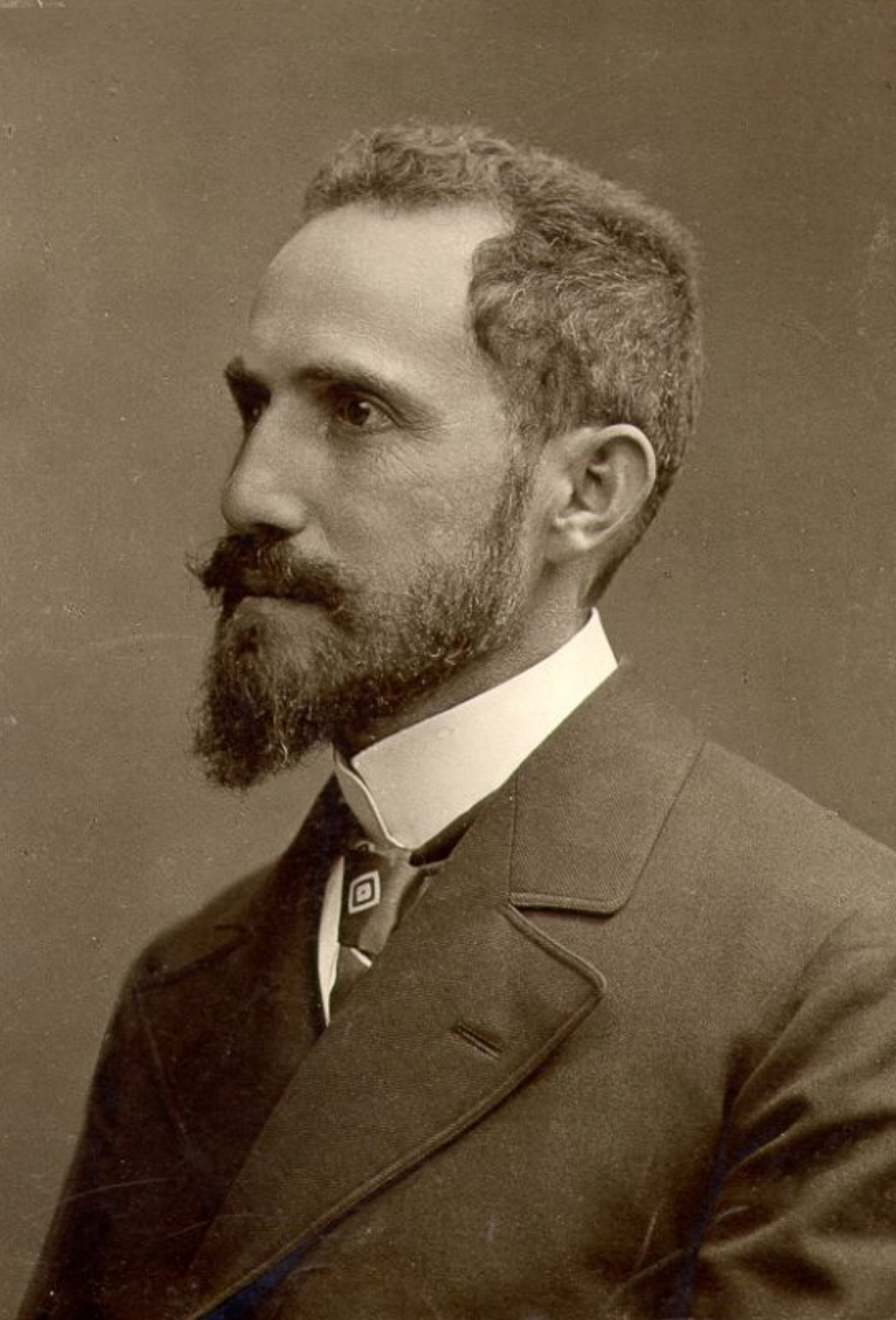
Willy Marckwald c. 1900 shortly after his Habilitation in 1889

Willy Marckwald (1864, Jakobskirch, Kingdom of Prussia – 1942, Rolândia, Brazil) was a German chemist.

== Biography ==
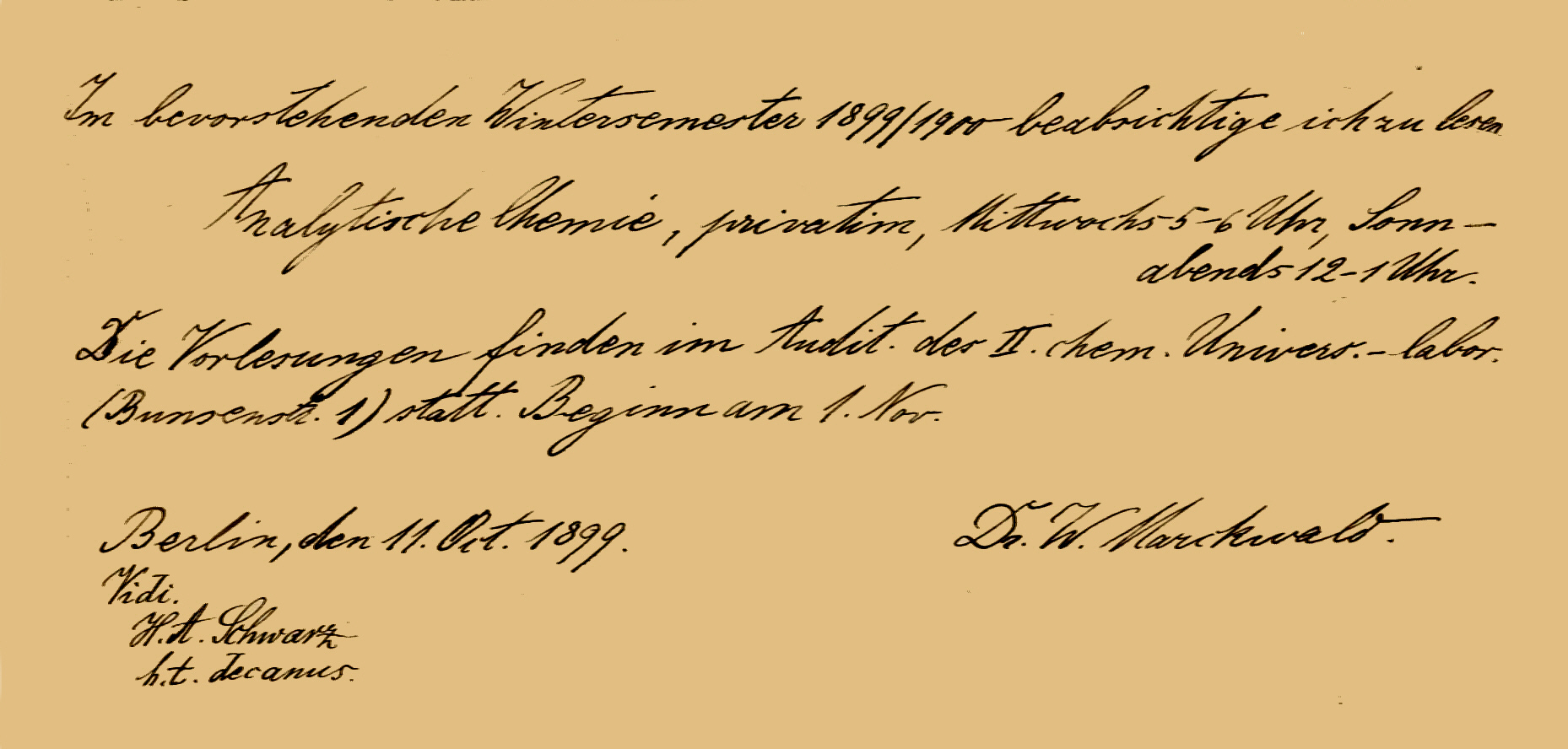
Dr. W. Marckwald's signature in 1899 at the beginning of his appointment to the II. Chemischen Institut

Marckwald studied at Berlin's Friedrich-Wilhelms-Universität and received there from the First Chemical Institute in 1886 his Promotierung under A. W. Hofmann with a dissertation on organic chemistry entitled Beitrag zur Kenntniss der Thialdehyde und Thialdine.

By his research on furans, Marckwald received his Habilitation in a very short time in 1889 under the supervision of A. W. Hofmann at Friedrich-Wilhelms-Universität Berlin. In 1899 Marckwald became one of the department heads at the Second Chemical Institute. He held this Privatdozent-level position until his age-related retirement in 1930.

From 1928 to 1931 he was the board chair of the German Chemical Society.

In 1890 Marckwald married Margarete Salomon (1871–1908). Their marriage produced two sons, Friedrich (1892–1917), who died in World War I as a naval aviator, and Johann (1902–1986). In 1936 Willy Marckwald, with his son Johann and his daughter-in-law Prisca, became immigrants in Brazil.

== Scientific work ==
From the starting point of his Promotierung dissertation and Habilitation, Marckwald developed a wide interest in all the fields of chemistry of his era. In heterocyclic chemistry, building upon the research done on Gabriel synthesis, he developed a method for synthesis of aziridines from β-halogen-amines. This ring closure method, known as the Gabriel-Marckwald reaction, allows the preparation of heterocyclic amines that are n-membered, where n=3,4,5,6, or 7. In so far as possible, Marckwald sold the patent rights for use in industry. On this topic, he also wrote monographs of general interest.

At the Second Chemical Institute, Marckwald did pioneering research on kinetic resolution and stereoselective synthesis.

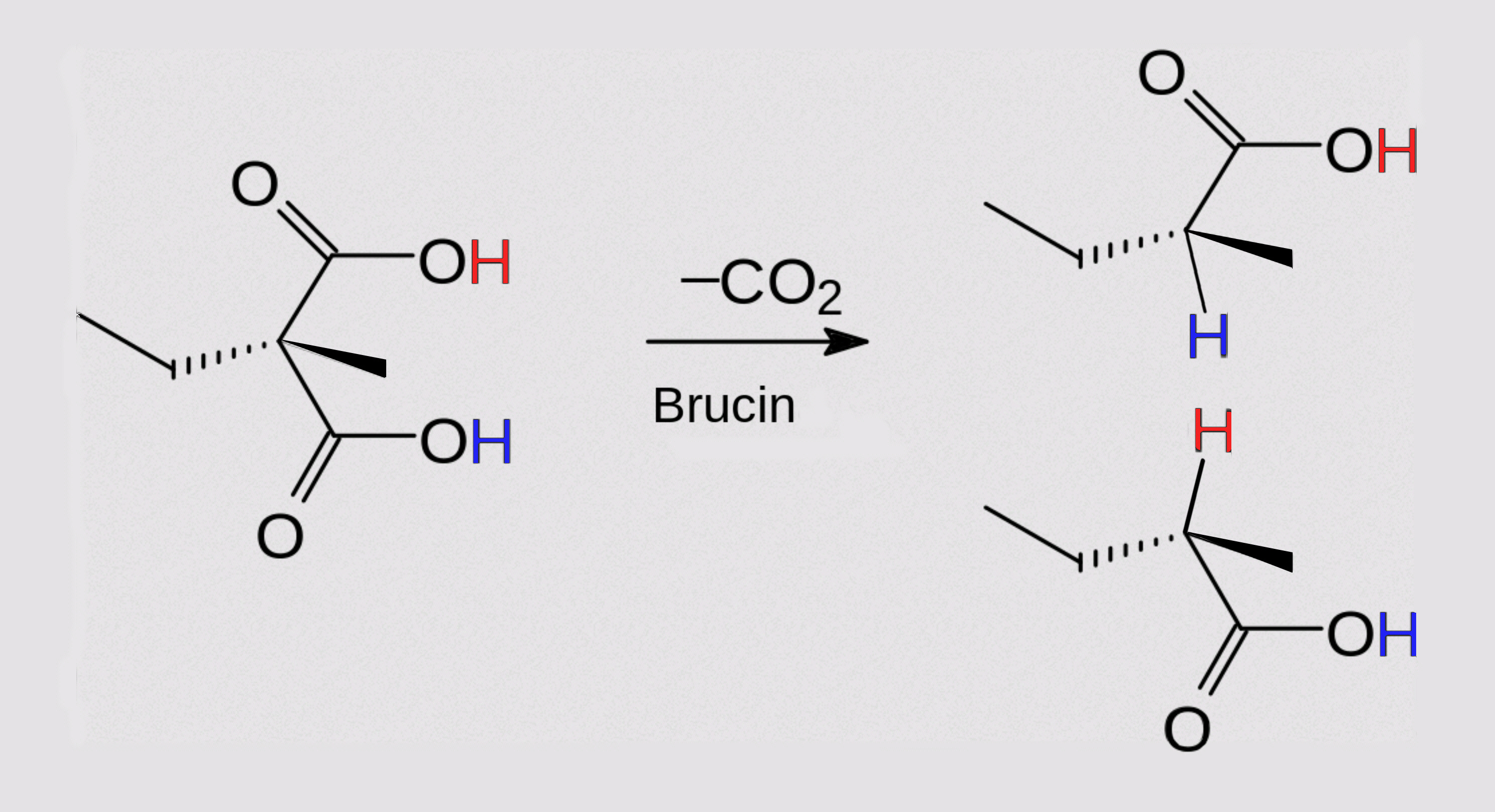
Asymmetrische Katalyse

Three of his outstanding achievements were:

- 1899, Kinetic resolution by synthetic means;
- 1900, Methods for enantiomer separation by crystallization of derivatives;
- 1904, Enantioselective chemical synthesis (Asymmetrische Katalyse).

At the Second Chemical Institute under Landolt's direction, Marckwald beginning in 1900 turned increasingly toward theory but also to the inorganic chemistry of radioactive compounds. He collaborated on Landolt's sections in the textbook Graham-Otto's ausführlichem Lehrbuch der Chemie. From 5 metric tons of uranium ore, in 1902 Marckwald succeeded in isolating 3 milligrams of polonium, which he provisionally (vorläufig) named radio-tellurium. In 1904 he published a monograph on radioactivity.

Marckwald has worked up the crude tellurium obtained from about 15 tons of pitchblende. By dissolving the material and precipitating with sulphur dioxide, about 16 g. of a mixture of selenium, tellurium and radio-tellurium were obtained. Upon oxidizing this with nitric acid, evaporating to dryness and warming with a solution of ammonia, a residue weighing about 3 mg. was obtained, which apparently contained practically all of the radio-active material, and possessed "enormous" activity.

In 1911 Marckwald and Alexander Smith Russell published evidence suggesting that the radioactive thorium isotope ^{230}Th and ionium are identical.

== Honors and awards ==
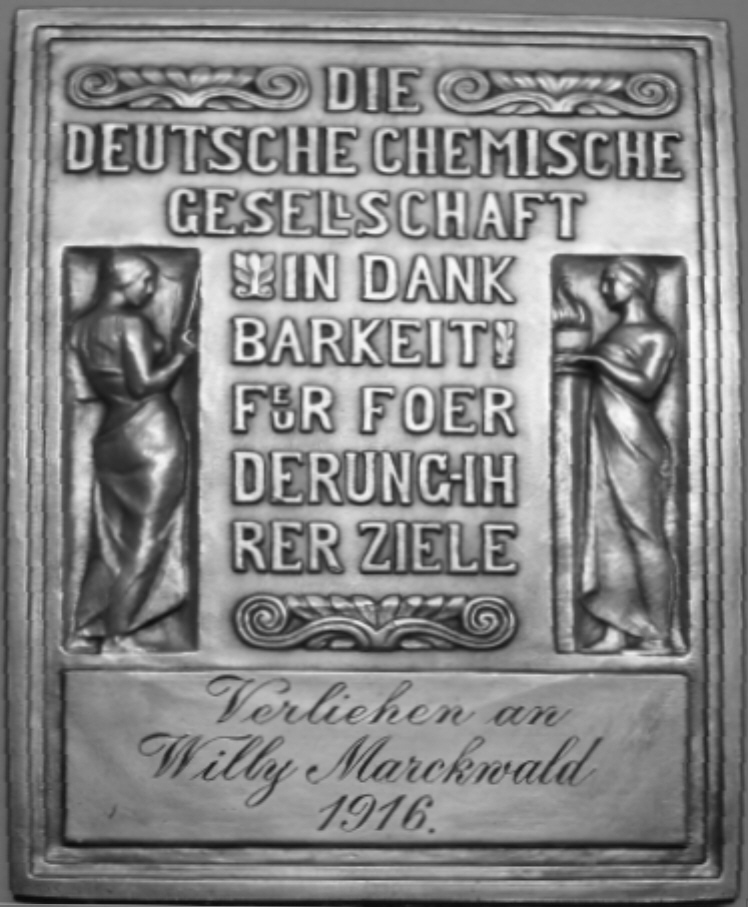
DChG-Ehrung 1916

- 1916 — special honor from the German Chemical Society
- 1919 — appointment as honorary professor of inorganic chemistry at the Königlichen Technischen Hochschule Charlottenburg
