= Kelliphite =

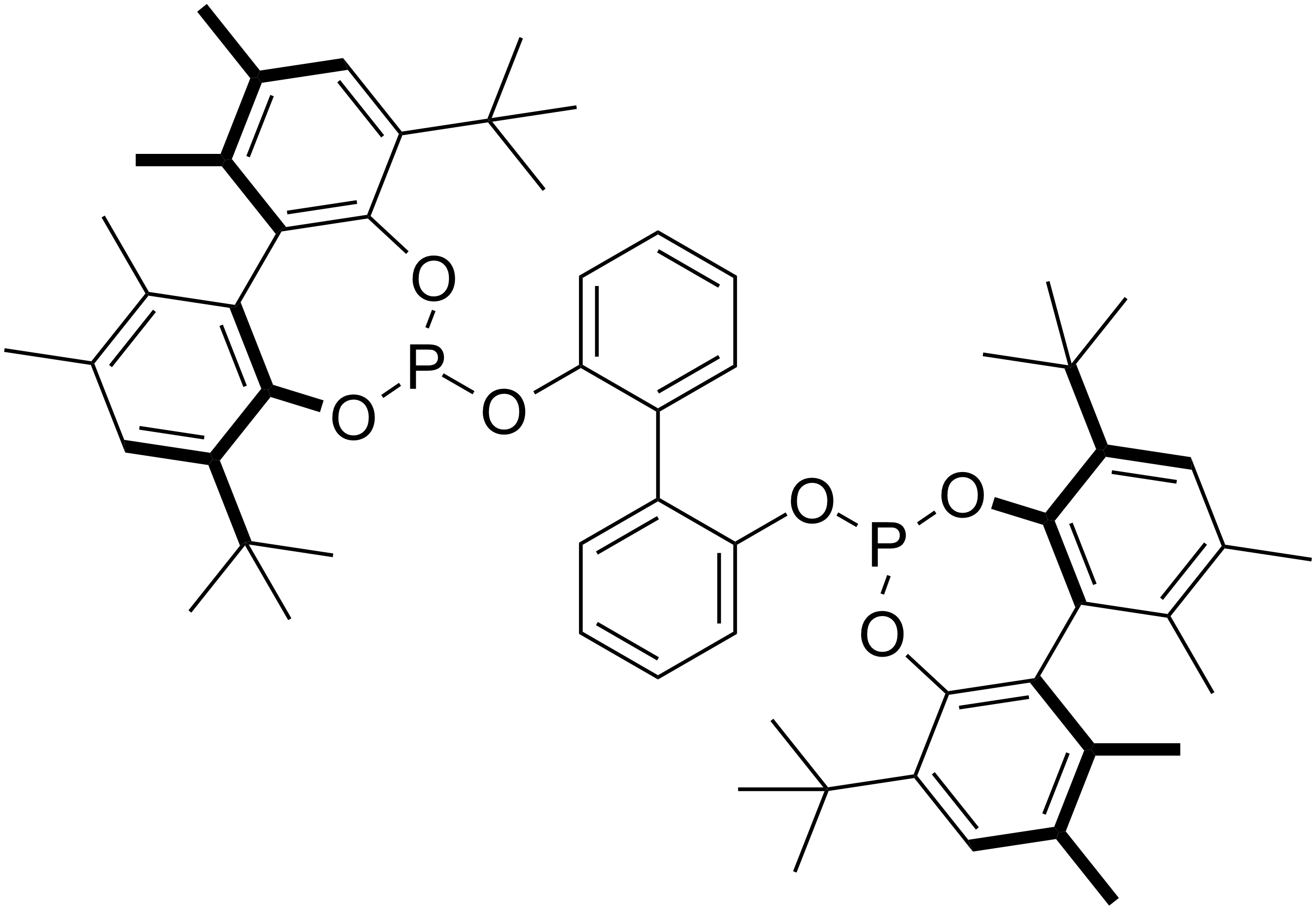

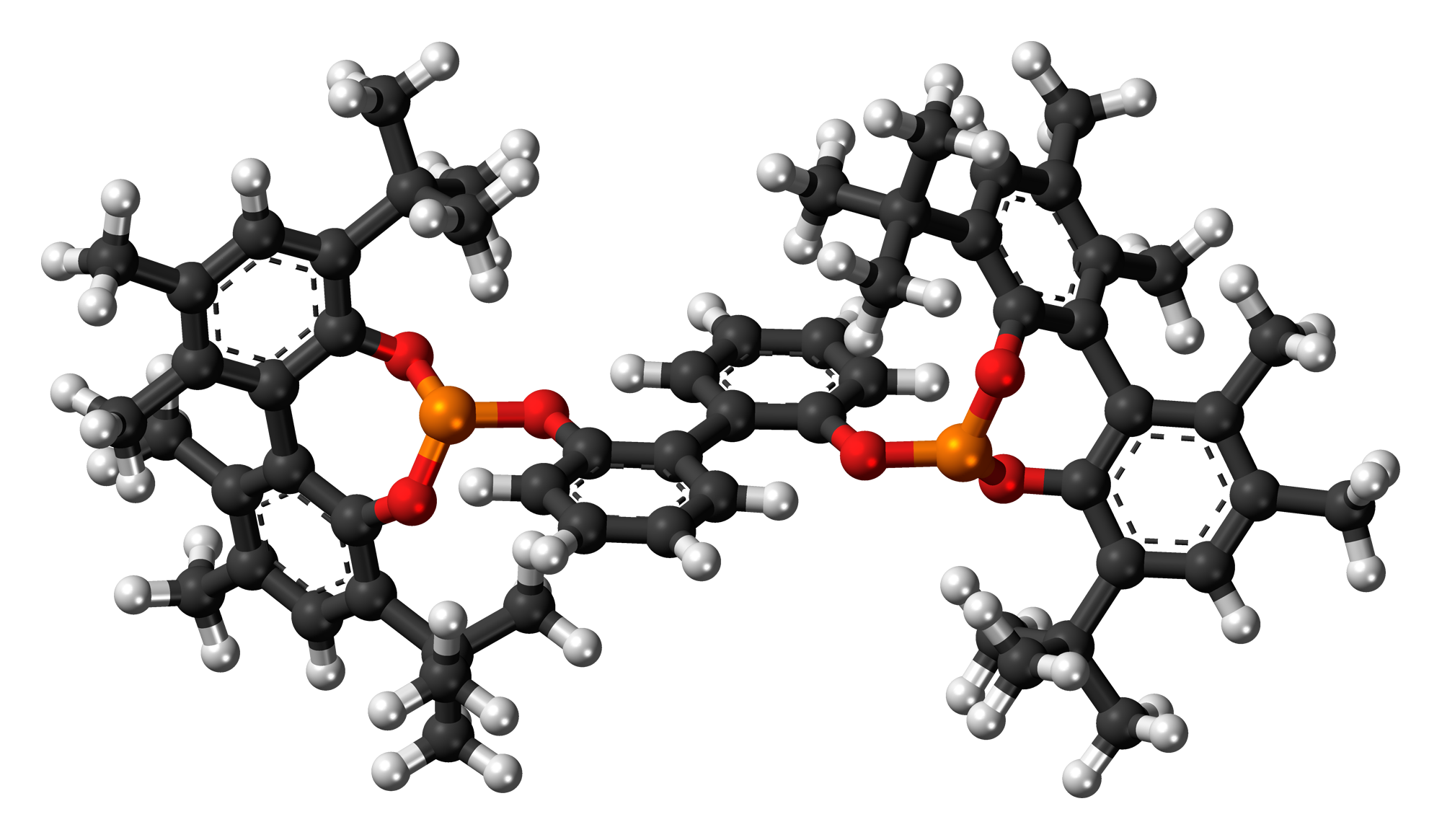

Names
- Preferred IUPAC name 6,6′-{[1,1′-Biphenyl]-2,2′-diylbis(oxy)}bis(4,8-di-tert-butyl-1,2,10,11-tetramethyl-6H-dibenzo[d,f][1,3,2]dioxaphosphepine)
- Other names Kelliphite

Identifiers
CAS Number	729572-33-2
3D model (JSmol)	Interactive image
ChemSpider	9990139
PubChem CID	11815482
CompTox Dashboard (EPA)	DTXSID401336795
- InChI: InChI=1S/C60H72O6P2/c1-33-29-43(57(9,10)11)53-49(37(33)5)50-38(6)34(2)30-44(58(12,13)14)54(50)64-67(63-53)61-47-27-23-21-25-41(47)42-26-22-24-28-48(42)62-68-65-55-45(59(15,16)17)31-35(3)39(7)51(55)52-40(8)36(4)32-46(56(52)66-68)60(18,19)20/h21-32H,1-20H3 Key: BWNYBZZRRYVGQK-UHFFFAOYSA-N
- SMILES: CC1=CC(=C2C(=C1C)C3=C(C(=CC(=C3OP(O2)OC4=CC=CC=C4C5=CC=CC=C5OP6OC7=C(C=C(C(=C7C8=C(C(=CC(=C8O6)C(C)(C)C)C)C)C)C)C(C)(C)C)C(C)(C)C)C)C)C(C)(C)C

Properties
Chemical formula	C_{60}H_{72}O_{6}P_{2}
Molar mass	951.178 g·mol^{−1}
Solubility in water	organic solvents
- Except where otherwise noted, data are given for materials in their standard state (at 25 °C [77 °F], 100 kPa). verify (what is ?) Infobox references

Kelliphite is an acronym for the organophosphorus compound 6,6'-[(1,1'-Biphenyl-2,2'-diyl)bis(oxy)]bis[4,8-di-tbutyl-1,2,10,11-tetramethyl]dibenzo[d,f][1,3,2]dioxaphosphepin. This chiral ligand is widely used in asymmetric synthesis. In one example, this ligand is used to form a rhodium complex to catalyze asymmetric hydroformylation of prochiral olefins. It has been shown that high substrate concentrations as well as a wide variety of functional groups are tolerated.
