= Tetrachlorocatechol =

Names
- Other names 3,4,5,6-Tetrachloro-1,2-benzenediol, Tetrachloropyrocatechol

Identifiers
CAS Number	1198-55-6
3D model (JSmol)	Interactive image
Beilstein Reference	1876366
ChEBI	CHEBI:26889
ChemSpider	13880
ECHA InfoCard	100.150.164
EC Number	621-298-4
Gmelin Reference	3937
KEGG	C18240
PubChem CID	14537
UNII	5REG09UJO0
CompTox Dashboard (EPA)	DTXSID4022151
- InChI: InChI=1S/C6H2Cl4O2/c7-1-2(8)4(10)6(12)5(11)3(1)9/h11-12H Key: RRBMVWQICIXSEO-UHFFFAOYSA-N
- SMILES: C1(=C(C(=C(C(=C1Cl)Cl)Cl)Cl)O)O

Properties
Chemical formula	C_{6}H_{2}Cl_{4}O_{2}
Molar mass	247.88 g·mol^{−1}
Appearance	white solid
Density	1.848 g/cm^{3} (20 °C)
Melting point	194 °C (381 °F; 467 K)

Hazards
- GHS labelling
Pictograms	(GHS05: Corrosive) (GHS06: Toxic) (GHS09: Environmental hazard)
Signal word	Danger
Hazard statements	H302, H318, H400
Precautionary statements	P264, P264+P265, P270, P273, P280, P301+P317, P305+P354+P338, P317, P330, P391, P501
- Except where otherwise noted, data are given for materials in their standard state (at 25 °C [77 °F], 100 kPa). Infobox references

Tetrachlorocatechol is an organochlorine compound with the formula C_{6}Cl_{4}(OH)_{2}. It is a white solid. It results from the degradation of the controversial pesticide pentachlorophenol. It is a precursor to the reagent TRISPHAT. Its conjugate base also functions as a ligand for transition metals.
