= Chiral analysis =

Scientific publications term

Chiral analysis refers to the quantification of component enantiomers of racemic drug substances or pharmaceutical compounds. Other synonyms commonly used include enantiomer analysis, enantiomeric analysis, and enantioselective analysis. Chiral analysis includes all analytical procedures focused on the characterization of the properties of chiral drugs. Chiral analysis is usually performed with chiral separation methods where the enantiomers are separated on an analytical scale and simultaneously assayed for each enantiomer.

Many compounds of biological and pharmacological interest are chiral. Pharmacodynamic, pharmacokinetic, and toxicological properties of the enantiomers of racemic chiral drugs has expanded significantly and become a key issue for both the pharmaceutical industry and regulatory agencies. Typically one of the enantiomers is more active pharmacologically (eutomer). In several cases, unwanted side effects or even toxic effects may occur with the inactive enantiomer (distomer). Even if the side effects are not that serious, the inactive enantiomer has to be metabolized, this puts an unnecessary burden on the already stressed out system of the patient. Large differences in activity between enantiomers reveal the need to accurate assessment of enantiomeric purity of pharmaceutical, agrochemicals, and other chemical entities like fragrances and flavors become very important. Moreover, the moment a racemic therapeutic is placed in a biological system, a chiral environment, it is no more 50:50 due enantioselective absorption, distribution, metabolism, and elimination (ADME) process. Hence to track the individual enantiomeric profile there is a need for chiral analysis tool.

Chiral technology is an active subject matter related to asymmetric synthesis and enantioselective analysis, particularly in the area of chiral chromatography. As a consequence of the advances in chiral technology, a number of pharmaceuticals currently marketed as racemic drugs are undergoing re-assessment as chiral specific products or chiral switches. Despite the choice to foster either a single enantiomer or racemic drug, in the current regulatory environment, there will be a need for enantioselective investigations. This poses a big challenge to pharmaceutical analysts and chromatographers involved in drug development process. In pharmaceutical research and development stereochemical analytical methodology may be required to comprehend enantioselective drug action and disposition, chiral purity assessment, study stereochemical stability during formulation and production, assess dosage forms, enantiospecific bioavailability and bioequivalence investigations of chiral drugs. Besides pharmaceutical applications chiral analysis plays a major role in the study of biological and environmental samples and also in the forensic field. Chiral analysis methods and applications between the period 2010 and 2020 are exhaustively reviewed recently. There are number of articles, columns, and interviews in LCGC relating to emerging trends in chiral analysis and its application in drug discovery and development process.

For chiral examination there is a need to have the right chiral environment. This could be provided as a plane polarized light, an additional chiral compound or by exploiting the inborn chirality of nature. The chiral analytical strategies incorporate physical, biological, and separation science techniques. Recently an optical-based absolute chiral analysis has been reported. The most frequently employed technique in enantioselective analysis involve the separation science techniques, in particular chiral chromatographic methods or chiral chromatography. Today wide range of CSPs are available commercially based on various chiral selectors including polysaccharides, cyclodextrins, glycopeptide antibiotics, proteins, Pirkle, crown ethers, etc. to achieve analysis of chiral molecules.

== Chiral chromatography ==
This term has become very popular and commonly used in practice. But the appropriate expression is "enantioselective chromatography". Chiral chromatography has advanced to turn into the most preferred technique for the determination of enantiomeric purity as well as separation of pure enantiomers both on analytical and preparative scale. Chiral chromatographic assay is the first step in any study pertaining to enantioselective synthesis or separation. This includes the use of techniques viz. gas chromatography (GC), high performance liquid chromatography (HPLC), chiral supercritical fluid chromatography (SFC), capillary electrophoresis (CE) and thin-layer chromatography (TLC). The result of a literature survey done identifies HPLC-based chiral assays as the most dominating technology in use. An overview of various analytical methods engaged for chiral separation and analysis are listed in the table.

Summary of analytical methods for chiral analysis
Method	Brief narrative of principle and application
Chromatographic	
Chiral HPLC	Chiral HPLC is used to separate enantiomers either by direct or indirect separation mode. Widely employed to check enantiomeric purity, provided the reference standards of the racemate or the two enantiomers are available. Capable of distinguishing between enantiomers and from the racemate; (+) from (-) and (±)
Chiral GC	Majority of chiral separations using GC are done with cyclodextrin derivatives as chiral selector. This method can be used to distinguish between enantiomers and from the racemate; (+) from (-) and (±)
Supercritical fluid chromatography (SFC)	Principle is very similar to that of HPLC. But SFC typically uses carbon dioxide as the mobile phase. Hence there is a need to pressurize the entire chromatographic flow path. SFC can differentiate enantiomers and enantiomer from the racemate; (+) from (-) and (±)
Chiral capillary electrophoresis (CE)	Chiral CE is based largely on separation of enantiomers by complex formation with cyclodextrins which is used as the chiral selector. Able to differentiate between enantiomers and from the racemate; (+) from (-) and (±)
Spectroscopic	
Polarimetry	Polarimetry uses the innate property of chiral molecules to rotate the plane-polarized light in equal and opposite direction. This method can be used to distinguish between enantiomers and from the racemate; (+) from (-) and (±)
Optical rotatory dispersion (ORD)	ORD is a curve obtained by plotting the measured optical activity of a chiral compound as a function of the wavelength of the light used. Distinguish between enantiomers and from the racemate; (+) from (-) and (±)
Circular dichroism (CD)	CD measures the differential absorption of left and right circularly polarized light by a chiral compound. These chiroptical techniques can be employed to identify and/or determine enantiomers
Nuclear magnetic resonanc (NMR)	NMR spectroscopy done using chiral shift reagents or chiral solvating reagents. Capable of discriminating enantiomers as well as the racemate
Infrared (IR)	Differentiate the racemate and its enantiomers but not between the enantiomeric pair; (+) or (-) from (±)
Calorimetry	
Differential scanning calorimetry (DSC)	The underlying principle is to measure the energy absorbed or evolved by a sample as a function of temperature. Data can distinguish between an enantiomer and the racemate, but not one enantiomer from its mirror-mage

== Principle - separation of enantiomers ==
In an isotopic/achiral environment, enantiomers exhibit identical physicochemical properties, and therefore are indistinguishable under these conditions. For the separation of chiral molecules the challenge is to construct the right chiral environment. In a chromatographic system there are three variables namely, the chiral analyte (CA), mobile phase and stationary phase, that can be manipulated to provide the crucial chiral environment. The strategy is to make these variables to interact with a chiral auxiliary (chiral selector, CS) whereby it forms a diastereomeric complex which has different physicochemical properties and makes it possible to separate the enantiomers. Based on the nature of the diastereomeric complex formed between the CS-CA species, enantiomer separation mythologies are categorized as indirect and direct enantiomer separation mode

=== Indirect separation of enantiomer ===
Indirect enantiomer separation involves the interaction between the chiral analyte (CA) of interest and the suitable reactive CS (in this case it is an enantiopure chiral derivatizing agent, CDA) leading to the formation of a covalent diastereomeric complex that can be separated with an achiral chromatographic technique. Therapeutic agents often contain reactive functional groups (amino, hydroxyl, epoxy, carbonyl and carboxylic acid, etc.) in their structures. They are converted into covalently bonded diastereomeric derivatives using enantiomerically pure chiral derivatizing agent. The diastereomers thus formed unlike enantiomers, exhibit different physicochemical properties in an achiral environment and are eventually separated as a result of differential retention time on a stationary phase. The success of this approach depends on the availability of stable enantiopure chiral derivatizing agent (CDA) and on the presence of a suitable reactive functional group in the chiral drug molecule for covalent formation of diastereomeric derivative. The reaction of a racemic, (R,S)- Drug with a chirally and chemically pure chiral derivatizing agent, (R')-CDA, will afford diastereomeric products, (R)-Drug-(R')-CDA + (S)-Drug-(R')- CDA. The chiral derivatization reaction scheme is illustrated in the box on the right hand side.

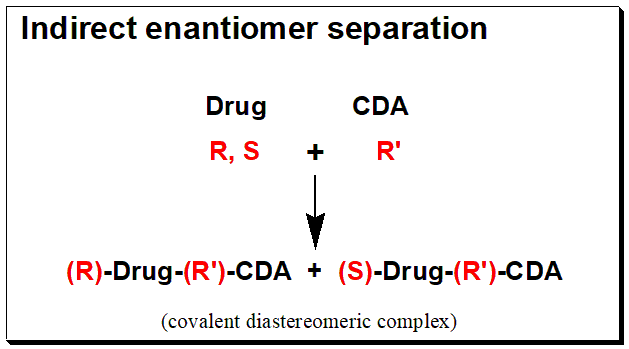
Indirect enantiomer separation - chiral derivatization

In contrast to enantiomers, diastereomers have different physicochemical properties that make them separable on regular achiral stationary phases. The major benefit of the indirect methodology is that conventional achiral stationary phase/mobile phase system may be used for the separation of the generated diastereomers. Thus, considerable flexibility in chromatographic conditions is available to achieve the desired separation and to eliminate interferences from metabolites and endogenous substances. Moreover, the sensitivity of the method can be enhanced by sensible choice of the CDA and the chromatographic detection system. But this indirect approach to enantiomeric analysis has some potential problems. These include availability of a suitable functional group on the enantiomer for derivatization, enantiomeric purity of the CDA, racemization of the CDA during derivatization, and racemization of the analyte during the derivatization. Currently, however, the application of indirect analytical approaches is in decline.

=== Direct separation of enantiomers ===
Direct enantiomer separation involves the formation of a transient rather than covalent diastereomeric complexation between the chiral selector/discriminator and the analyte (drug enantiomer). In this approach, the subtle energy differences between the reversibly formed noncovalent diastereomeric complexes are exploited for chiral recognition. The direct chromatographic enantiomer separation may be achieved in two different ways, the chiral mobile phase additive and chiral stationary phase mode.

==== Chiral mobile phase additive (CMPA) ====
In this approach, an enantiomerically pure compound, the chiral selector, is added to the mobile phase and separation happens on a conventional achiral column. When a mixture of enantiomers is introduced into the chromatographic system, the individual enantiomers form transient diastereomeric complexes with the chiral mobile phase additive. In the chiral mobile phase additive technique, two possible mechanisms may operate: one possibility is that CMPA and the enantiomers may form diastereomers in the mobile phase. Another is that the stationary phase may be coated with the CMPA, leading to diastereomeric interactions with the enantiomeric pairs during chromatographic separation process. It is observed that both the mechanisms may happen depending on the characteristic of the stationary phase and mobile phase employed. Of late this method finds limited application.

==== Chiral stationary phase (CSP) ====
In the direct enantiomer separation the most popular approach is use of chiral stationary phases. In this case the site of the chiral selector is on the stationary phase. Stationary phase consist of an inert solid support (usually silica microparticles) on to the surface of which a single enantiomer of a chiral molecule (selector) is either coated/adsorbed or chemically linked and that forms the chiral stationary phase. Commonly used chiral selectors include polysaccharides, proteins, cyclodextrins, etc. An interesting review of chiral stationary phase development and application in chiral analysis appeared in LCGC magazine, 2011.

== Chiral recognition ==
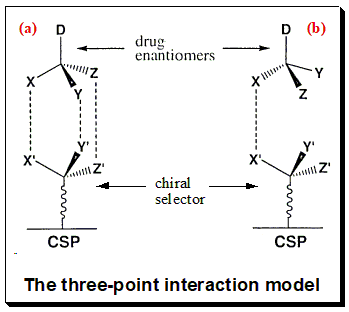
Dalgliesh model

Chiral recognition implies the ability of chiral stationery phases to interact differently with mirror-image molecules, leading to their separation. The mechanism of enantiomeric resolution using CSPs is generally attributed to the "three-point" interaction model (fig.1.) between the analyte and the chiral selector in the stationary phase. Also known as the Dalgliesh model. Under this model, for chiral recognition, and hence enantiomeric resolution to happen on a CSP one of the enantiomers of the analyte must be involved in three simultaneous interactions. This means to say the one of enantiomers is able to have a good interaction with the complimentary sites on the chiral selector attached to the CSP. While Its mirror-image partner may only interact at two or one such sites. In the figure, enantiomer (a), has the correct configuration of the ligands (X, Y and Z) for three-point interactions with the complimentary sites (X', Y' and Z') on the CSP, while its mirror image (b) can only interact at one site. The dotted lines (-----) indicate interaction with complimentary sites.

The diastereomeric complexes thus formed will have different energies of interaction. The enantiomer forming the more stable complex will have less energy and stay longer in the stationary phase compared to the less stable complex with higher energy. The success of chiral separation basically depends in manipulating the subtle energy differences between the reversibly formed non-covalent transient diastereomeric complexes. The energy difference reflects the magnitude of enantioselectivity. Mobile phase has a major role in stabilizing the diastereomeric complex and thus in chiral separation. This simplified bimolecular interaction model is a treatment suitable for theoretical purposes. Mobile phase plays a key role in chiral recognition mechanism. Components of MP (such as bulk solvents, modifiers, buffer salts, additives) not only influence the conformational flexibility of CS and CA molecules but also their degree of ionization. The types of interaction involved in the analyte-selector interaction vary depending on the nature of the CSP used. These may include hydrogen bonding, dipole-dipole, π-π, electrostatic, hydrophobic or steric interactions, and inclusion complex formation.

== Classical chiral selectors and CSPs ==
The intense research for development of efficient chiral selectors has resulted in the synthesis of over 1400 CSPs and over 200 CSPs have been commercialized and available in the market. The most commonly employed chiral selectors are categorized and presented in the table.

Classical chiral selectors
Type of CSP	Chemistry	Chiral distinction mechanism	Loading capacity mg/g (CSP)
Polymer	Polysaccharides	H-bonding, dipole-dipole interactions; inclusion ion complexes also play an important role	5-150
Polymer	Proteins	Hydrophobic and electrostatic interactions	0.1 - 0.2
Macrocycles	Native and derivatized Cyclodextrins	Inclusion complexes, H-bonding; solute enters the cavities within the CSP to form inclusion complexes	0.1 - 0.5
Macrocycles	Glycopeptide antibiotics	H-bonding; π-π interactions, dipole sacking; steric; hydrophobic pocket	0.1 - 0.5
Macrocycles	Crown ethers		0.1 - 0.5
Low-molecular weight scaffolds	Pirkle type	H-bonding; π-π interactions, dipole sacking	1-50
Low-molecular weight scaffolds	Ligand-exchange	Coordination complexes to metals	0.1 - 0.5

=== Polysaccharide CSPs ===
==== Background ====
It is surprising to note that In 1980, there was no single chiral stationary phase available in the market for performing chiral chromatography. However, In late 1980s the subject of enantioselective chromatography attracted growing interest, particularly under the drive of the institution of Okamoto in Japan, the teams of Pirkle, and Armstrong in the US, Schurig and König in Germany, Lindner in Austria, and Francotte in Switzerland . The Polysaccharides, amylose and cellulose, form the most abundant chiral polymers on earth. These naturally occurring polysaccharides form basis for an important class of chiral selectors.

==== Chemistry ====
Amylose and cellulose cannot be used as such due to poor resolution and difficulty in handling. But the carbamate and benzoate derivatives of these polymers, especially amylose and cellulose, demonstrate excellent properties as chiral selectors for chromatographic separation. A large number of polysaccharide-based CSPs are commercially available for chiral separation. These CSPs showed tremendous chiral recognition capability to resolve a wide range of chiral analytes. Many of these CSPs have been marketed by Daicel Chemical Industries, Ltd., and some of the popular ones are listed in the table.

Popular chiral selectors incorporated in polysaccharide-type Chiral stationary phases
#	Adsorbent / Stationary phase description	Chiral stationary phase (Trade name)
1.	Cellulose tris-(3,5-dimethyl phenyl carbamate)	Chiralcel OD^{®} (Daicel)
2.	Cellulose tris-(4-methyl benzoate )	Chiralcel OJ^{®} / Lux® Cellulose-3 (Phenomenex)
3.	Amylose tris(3,5-dimethyl phenyl carbamate)	Chiralpak AD^{®} (Daicel)
4.	Amylose tris(S)-a-methyl benzyl carbamate	Chiralpak AS^{®} (Daicel)
5.	Cellulose tris(3-chloro-4-methylphenylcarbamate)	Chiralcel OZ^{®} (Daicel)
6.	Amylose tris(5-chloro-2-methylphenylcarbamate)	Chiralcel AY^{®} (Daicel)
7.	Amylose tris(3-chloro-4-methylphenylcarbamate)	Chirlpak AZ^{®} (Daicel)
8.	Cellulose tris(4-chloro-3-methylphenylcarbamate)	Chiralcel OX^{®} (Daicel)
9.	tris (3,5-dimethylphenyl) carbamoyl cellulose selector	RegisCell®
10.	tris (3,5-dimethylphenyl) carbamoyl amylose selector	RegisPack®

These CSPs are compatible with NP/RP and SFC and also used for analytical, semi-preparative and preparative separations. Many screening research studies conducted at different labs go to suggest that the four CSPs namely Chiralcel OD, Chiralcel OJ, Chiralpak AD, and Chiralpak As are capable of resolving more than 80% of the chiral separations due to their adaptability and high loading capacity. These four polysaccharide chiral stationary stationary phases are referred to as the "golden four".

Polysaccharide CSPs are prepared with high quality silica support on to which the polymeric chiral selector (amylose/cellulose dr.) is physically coated (coated CSP) or chemically immobilized (immobilized CSP). Separations can be done in normal phase, reversed-phase, and polar organic mode. While working with coated polysaccharide CSP solvent selection should be done with caution. One should not use drastic solvents such as dichloromethane, chloroform, toluene, ethyl acetate, THF; 1,4-dioxane; acetone; DMSO, etc. These so called "non-standard" solvents will dissolve the silica and irreversibly destroy the stationary phase. The limited resistance of these coated phases to many solvents lead to the development of immobilized polysaccharide CSP. The table below presents some of the immobilized CSP commercially available and with the alternates wherever accessible.

Immobilized chiral stationary phases
#	Chiral selector/Adsorbent chemistry	Chiral stationary phase/ Suppliers		
		Daicel^{®}	Phenomenex^{®}	Reprosil^{®}
1	Amylose tris(3,5-dimethylphenyl)carbamate (as in Chiralpak® AD)	Chiralpak^{®} IA	Lux® i-Amylose-1	Reprosil^{®} MIA
2	Cellulose tris(3,5-dimethylphenyl)carbamate (as in Chiralcel® OD)	Chiralcel^{®} IB	-----	Reprosil^{®} MIB
3	Cellulose tris(3,5-dichlorophenyl)carbamate	Chiralcel^{®} IC	Lux® i-Cellulose-5	Reprosil^{®} MIC
4	Amylose tris(3-chlorophenyl)carbamate	Chiralpak^{®} ID	-----	-----
5	Amylose tris(3,5-dichlorophenyl)carbamate	Chiralpak^{®} IE	-----	-----
6	Amylose tris(3-chloro,4-methylphenyl)carbamate	Chiralpak^{®} IF	-----	-----
7	Amylose tris(3-chloro,5-methylphenyl)carbamate	Chiralpak^{®} IG	-----	-----

These immobilized CSP are much more rugged and the "non-standard" solvents can be employed. Thus expanding the choice of co-solvent. The major strength of immobilized CSPs are high solvent versatility in selection of mobile phase composition, enhanced sample solubility, high selectivity, robustness and extended durability, excellent column efficiency, and broad application domain in the resolution of enantiomers. Solvent is a key factor in HPLC MD. More solvents to play with means better sample solubility, Improves resolution, and enables effective chiral method development.

==== Mechanism ====
Number of chiral environments are created within the polymer. Cavities are formed between adjacent glucose units, and spaces/channels between polysaccharide chains. These chiral cavities or channels give the chiral discrimination capability to polysaccharide CSPs. The mechanism of Chiral discrimination is not well understood but believed to involve hydrogen bonding and dipole-dipole interaction between the analyte molecule and the ester or carbamate linkage of the CSP.

==== Application ====
Some of the applications of these CSPs include the direct chiral analysis of β-adrenergic blockers such as metoprolol and celiprolol, the calcium channel blocker, felodipine and the anticonvulsant agent, ethotoin.

=== Macrocyclic CSPs ===
An interesting way of achieving chiral distinction on a CSP is the use of selectors with chiral cavity. These chiral selectors are attached to the stationary phase support material. In this category, there are basically three types of cavity chiral selectors namely cyclodextrins, crown ethers and macrocyclic glycopeptide antibiotics. Among these cyclodextrin based CSP is popular. In this type of CSPs the enantioselective guest-host interaction governs the chiral distinction.

==== Cyclodextrin-type CSP ====
Cyclodextrins (CDs) are cyclic oligosaccharides of six, seven, or eight glucose units designated as α, β, and γ cyclodextrins respectively. Depicted in the diagram below. Daniel Armstrong is considered the pioneer of micelle and cyclodextrin-based separations. Cyclodextrins are covalently attached to silica by Armstrong process and provide stable CSPs. The primary hydroxyl groups are used to anchor the CD molecules to the modified silica surface. CDs are chiral because of innate chirality of the building blocks, glucose units. In cyclodextrin the glucose units are α-(1,4)- connected. The shape of CD looks like a shortened cone (see the sketch). The inner surface of the cone forms moderately hydrophobic pocket. The width of the CD-cavity is identified with the quantity of glucose units present. In cyclodextrins, secondary hydroxyl groups (OH-2 and - 3) line the upper rim of the cavity, and an essential 6-hydroxyl group is positioned at the lower rim. The hydroxyl group offer chiral binding points, which appear to be fundamental for enantioselectivity. Apolar glyosidic oxygen makes the pit hydrophobic and guarantees inclusion complexing of the hydrophobic moiety of analytes. Interactions between the polar area of an analyte and secondary hydroxyl groups at the mouth of the pit, joined with the hydrophobic connections inside the pit, give a unique two-point fit and lead to enantioselectivity.

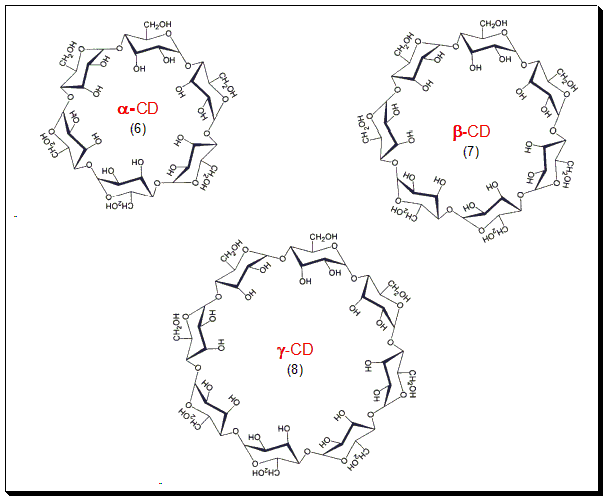
Structure of native cyclodextrins

Selectivity of a cyclodextrin phase is dependent on two key factors namely the size and structure of the analyte since it is based on a simple fit-unfit geometric criteria. An aromatic ring or cycloalkyl ring should be attached near the stereogenic center of the analyte. Substituents at or near the analyte chiral center must be able to interact with the hydroxyl groups at the entrance of the CD cavity through H-bonding. α-Cyclodextrin holds small aromatic molecules, whereas β-cyclodextrin incorporates both naphthyl groups and substituted phenyl groups. The aqueous compatibility of CD and its unique molecular structure make the CD- bonded phase highly suitable for use in chiral HPLC analysis of drugs. One further benefit of CD is that they are generally less expensive than the other CSPs. Some of the major shortcomings of CD CSPs is that it is limited to compounds that can enter into CD cavity, minor structural changes in analyte leads to unpredictable effect on resolution, often poor efficiency and cannot invert elution order.

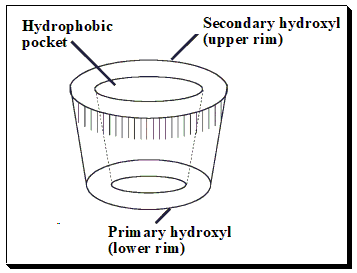
Sketch of cone shape of cyclodextrin

Enantiomers of propranolol, metoprolol, chlorpheniramine, verapamil, hexobarbitaI, methadone and much more drugs have been separated using immobilized β-cyclodextrin.

Initially natural CDs have been used as the chiral selector. Later, modified cyclodextrin structures have been prepared by derivatizing the secondary hydroxyl groups present on the CD molecule. Incorporation of these additional functional groups may improve the chiral recognition capability by possibly modifying the chiral pocket and creating extra auxiliary interaction site. This approach enabled to expand the range of target chiral analytes that could be separated. A number of chiral pharmaceuticals has been resolved using derivatized CDs including ibuprofen, suprofen, flurbiprofen from NSAID category and b-blockers like metoprolol and atenolol. A brief list of cyclodextrin-based chiral stationary stationary phases available in the market is furnished in the table below.

Summary of commercially available cyclodextrin-type CSPs
Chiral stationary phase (Brand name)	Chiral selector/chemical description	Mode ^{#}	Company/ Major distributor
Cyclobond^{®} I 2000	Natural β-Cyclodextrin	RP, PO	Advanced Separation Technology (Astec), Whippany, NJ
Cyclobond^{®} II	Natural γ-Cyclodextrin	RP, PO	Astec
Cyclobond^{®} III	Natural α-Cyclodextrin	RP, PO	Astec
Cyclobond^{®} I 2000 AC	Acetylated β-Cyclodextrin	RP, PO	Astec
Cyclobond^{®} I 2000 SP	(S)-Hydroxypropyl β-Cyclodextrin	RP, PO	Astec
Cyclobond^{®} I 2000 SN	(S)-1(1-napthyl)ethyl carbamoyl-β-Cyclodextrin	RP, NP, PO	Astec
Cyclobond^{®} I 2000 RN	(R)-1(1-napthyl)ethyl carbamoyl-β-Cyclodextrin	RP, NP, PO	Astec
Cyclobond^{®} I 2000 DMP	3,5-dimethylphenyl carbamoyl-β-Cyclodextrin	RP, NP, PO	Astec
Cyclobond^{®} II AC	Acetylated γ-Cyclodextrin	RP, PO	Astec
Cyclobond^{®} III AC	Acetylated α-Cyclodextrin	RP, PO	Astec
ChiraDex^{®}	Native α-Cyclodextrin	RP, PO	Merck, Germany
ChiraDex^{®} Gamma	Native γ-Cyclodextrin	RP, PO	Merck
Note: ^{#} RP, reversed phase; PO, Polar organic; NP, normal phase.

==== Glycopeptide-type CSP ====
Armstrong introduced macrocyclic glycopeptides (also known as glycopeptide antibiotics) as a new class of chiral selector for liquid chromatography in 1994. At present, vancomycin, teicoplanin and ristocetin are available under the brand names Chirobiotic V, Chirobiotic T and Chirobiotic R respectively. These cyclic glycopeptides have multiple chiral centers and a cup-like inclusion area to which a floating sugar lid is attached. Similar to protein chiral selectors, the amphoteric cyclic glycopeptides consist of peptide and carbohydrate binding sites leading to possibilities for different modes of interaction beside the formation of inclusion complexation. In this chiral selector the cavities are shallower than that of CDs and hence the interactions are weaker, allows more rapid solute exchange between phases, higher column efficiency. operates in normal phase, reversed-phase and polar organic phase.

The complex structural nature of glycopeptide antibiotic class of CSP has made the understanding of the mechanism of chiral recognition at molecular level tricky. For instance, vancomycin molecule has 18 stereogenic centers in the molecule and offers a complex cyclodextrin-like chiral environment. In comparison to a single basket of cyclodextrins, vancomycin consists of three baskets, resulting in a more complex inclusion of appropriate guest molecules. The attractive forces include π-π interactions, hydrogen bonding, ionic interactions, and dipole stacking. A carboxylic acid and a secondary amine group located on the rim of the cup and can participate in ionic interactions. Vancomycin stationary phases operate in reversed, normal and polar organic phase modes.

Wide range of chiral analysis has been done using chirobiotic CSPs. The antihypertensive drugs viz. oxprenolol, pindolol, propranolol have been separated using vancomycin and teicoplanin chirobiotic CSPS. The NSAID drugs ketoprofen and ibuprofen has been separated using ristocetin CSP.

==== Crown ether-type CSP ====
Crown ethers, like cyclodextrin-type CSPs contain a chiral cavity. Crown ethers are immobilized on the silica surface to form chiral stationary phase. Crown ethers contain oxygen atoms within the cavity. The cyclic structure that contains apolar ethylene groups between oxygen forms hydrophobic inner cavity. Cram et al., introduced CSP based on chiral crown ethers and accomplished separation of amino acid. The crucial chiral recognition principle underlying crown ether-based enantiomer separation is based on the formation of numerous hydrogen bonds between the protonated primary amino group of the analyte and the ether oxygens of the crown structure. This structural requirement confines the application of crown ether-type CSPs to chiral compounds having primary amino groups adjoining the chiral centers, such as amino acids, amino acid derivatives. Progress in the field of crown ether-type CSPs have been reviewed.

=== Protein-type CSP ===
Proteins are complex, high-molecular weight biopolymers. They are inherently chiral being composed of L-amino acids and possess ordered 3D-structure. They are known to bind/interact stereoselectively with small molecules reversibly, making them extremely versatile CSPs for chiral separation of drug molecules. Hermansson made use of this property to develop number of CSPs by immobilizing proteins on to silica surface. They operate under reverse phase mode (phosphate buffer and organic modifiers).

Protein polymer remains in twisted form because of the different intramolecular bonding. These bonding create different type of chiral loops/grooves present in the protein molecule. Separation mechanism of proteins depends on unique combination of hydrophobic and polar interactions by which the analytes are oriented to chiral surfaces. H-bonding and charge transfer may also contribute to enantioselectivity. The mechanism of chiral distinction by proteins is mostly not well established due to their complex nature. Several proteins based CSP have been employed for chiral drug analysis including α-acid glycoprotein (enantiopac; chiral-AGP), ovomucoid protein (Ultron ES DVM), human serum albumin (HSA). α-AGP CSP (chiral AGP), has been employed for the quantification of atenolol enantiomers in biological matrices, for pharmacokinetic investigation of racemic metoprolol. The major weakness of protein based CSPs include low loading capacity, protein phases are expensive, extremely fragile, delicate to handle, very low column efficiency, cannot invert elution order.

=== Pirkle-type CSP ===
Pirkle and co-workers pioneered the development of a variety of CSPs based on charge-transfer complexation and simultaneous hydrogen bonding. These phases are also referred to as Brush-type CSPs. The Pirkle phases are based on aromatic π-acid (3,5-dinitrobenzoyI ring) and π- basic (naphthalene) derivative. In addition to π-π interaction sites, they have hydrogen-bonding and dipole-dipole interaction sites provided by an amide, urea or ester functionality. Strong three-point interaction, according to Dalgleish's model, enables enantioseparation. These phases are classified into π-electron-acceptor, π-electron-donor or π-electron acceptor-donor phase.

A number of Pirkle-type CSPs are commercially available. They are used most often in the normal phase mode. The ionic form of the DNPBG (3,5-dinitrobenzoyl-phenylglycine) CSP has been successfully employed to achieve separation of racemic propranolol in biological fluid. Many compounds of pharmaceutical interest including enantiomers of naproxen and metoprolol has been separated using Pirkle CSP.

== Novel chiral selectors and CSPs ==
During the last couple of years there has been developments of CSPs based on novel chiral selectors viz. chitosan derivatives, cylofructan derivatives and chiral porous materials for HPLC chiral separation.

=== Chiral porous materials based CSP ===
See also

- Chiral resolution
- Chiral chromatography
- Chiral drugs
- Chiral switch
- Enantiomer
- Chirality
