= Pirkle's alcohol =

Names
- IUPAC name 1-Anthracen-9-yl-2,2,2-trifluoroethanol
- Other names 2,2,2-Trifluoro-1-(9-anthryl)ethanol

Identifiers
CAS Number	65487-67-4; 53531-34-3 (R); 60646-30-2 (S)
3D model (JSmol)	Interactive image; (R): Interactive image; (S): Interactive image
ChemSpider	93716; 5370700 (R); 2006270 (S)
ECHA InfoCard	100.059.793
PubChem CID	103802; 7006444 (R); 2724111 (S)
UNII	5K227FG858
CompTox Dashboard (EPA)	DTXSID70968284
- InChI: InChI=1S/C16H11F3O/c17-16(18,19)15(20)14-12-7-3-1-5-10(12)9-11-6-2-4-8-13(11)14/h1-9,15,20H Key: ICZHJFWIOPYQCA-UHFFFAOYSA-N; (R): InChI=1S/C16H11F3O/c17-16(18,19)15(20)14-12-7-3-1-5-10(12)9-11-6-2-4-8-13(11)14/h1-9,15,20H/t15-/m1/s1 Key: ICZHJFWIOPYQCA-OAHLLOKOSA-N; (S): InChI=1S/C16H11F3O/c17-16(18,19)15(20)14-12-7-3-1-5-10(12)9-11-6-2-4-8-13(11)14/h1-9,15,20H/t15-/m0/s1 Key: ICZHJFWIOPYQCA-HNNXBMFYSA-N
- SMILES: OC(C(F)(F)F)C1=C2C(C=CC=C2)=CC3=CC=CC=C31; (R): FC(F)(F)[C@H](O)c2c3c(cc1c2cccc1)cccc3; (S): C1=CC=C2C(=C1)C=C3C=CC=CC3=C2[C@@H](C(F)(F)F)O

Properties
Chemical formula	C_{16}H_{11}F_{3}O
Molar mass	276.258 g·mol^{−1}
- Except where otherwise noted, data are given for materials in their standard state (at 25 °C [77 °F], 100 kPa). verify (what is ?) Infobox references

Pirkle's alcohol is an off-white, crystalline solid that is stable at room temperature when protected from light and oxygen. This chiral molecule is typically used, in nonracemic form, as a chiral shift reagent in nuclear magnetic resonance spectroscopy, in order to simultaneously determine absolute configuration and enantiomeric purity of other chiral molecules. The molecule is named after William H. Pirkle, Professor of Chemistry at the University of Illinois whose group reported its synthesis and its application as a chiral shift reagent.

== Synthesis ==
Pirkle's alcohol is synthesized by trifluoroacetylation of anthracene, to yield trifluoromethyl 9-anthryl ketone. Trifluoromethyl 9-anthryl ketone may be reduced with a chiral hydride reagent prepared from lithium aluminium hydride and (4S,5S)-(–)-2-ethyl-4-hydroxymethyl-5-phenyl-2-oxazoline to generate Pirkle's alcohol with R absolute configuration. Alternatively, trifluoromethyl 9-anthryl ketone may be reduced with sodium borohydride to generate racemic Pirkle's alcohol. The enantiomers are then derivatized to diastereomeric carbamates using enantioenriched 1-(1-Naphthyl)ethyl isocyanate (also developed by Pirkle). These diastereomers may be separated by column chromatography and hydrolyzed to obtain each enantiomer of Pirkle's alcohol in enantiopure form.

== Application ==
The determination of enantiomeric purity and absolute configuration is frequently necessary in organic synthesis. Pirkle's alcohol is applied to obtain this information by NMR spectroscopy. When Pirkle's alcohol is in solution with an ensemble of chiral molecules, short-lived diastereomeric solvates may be formed from Pirkle's alcohol and the enantiomers of the analyte. Enantiomorphic protons of the analyte enantiomers, which without Pirkle's alcohol are indistinguishable by NMR, become diastereomorphic when the analyte interacts with Pirkle's alcohol, and appear as different signals in an NMR spectrum. The relative magnitude of the signals quantitatively reveals the enantiomeric purity of the analyte. Also, a model of the solvated complex may be used to deduce absolute configuration of an enantioenriched analyte.

== See also ==
- 2,2,2-Trifluoroethanol
- Mosher's acid
- 9-Anthracenemethanol
