= Chiral derivatizing agent =

Reagent for converting a chemical compound to a chiral derivative

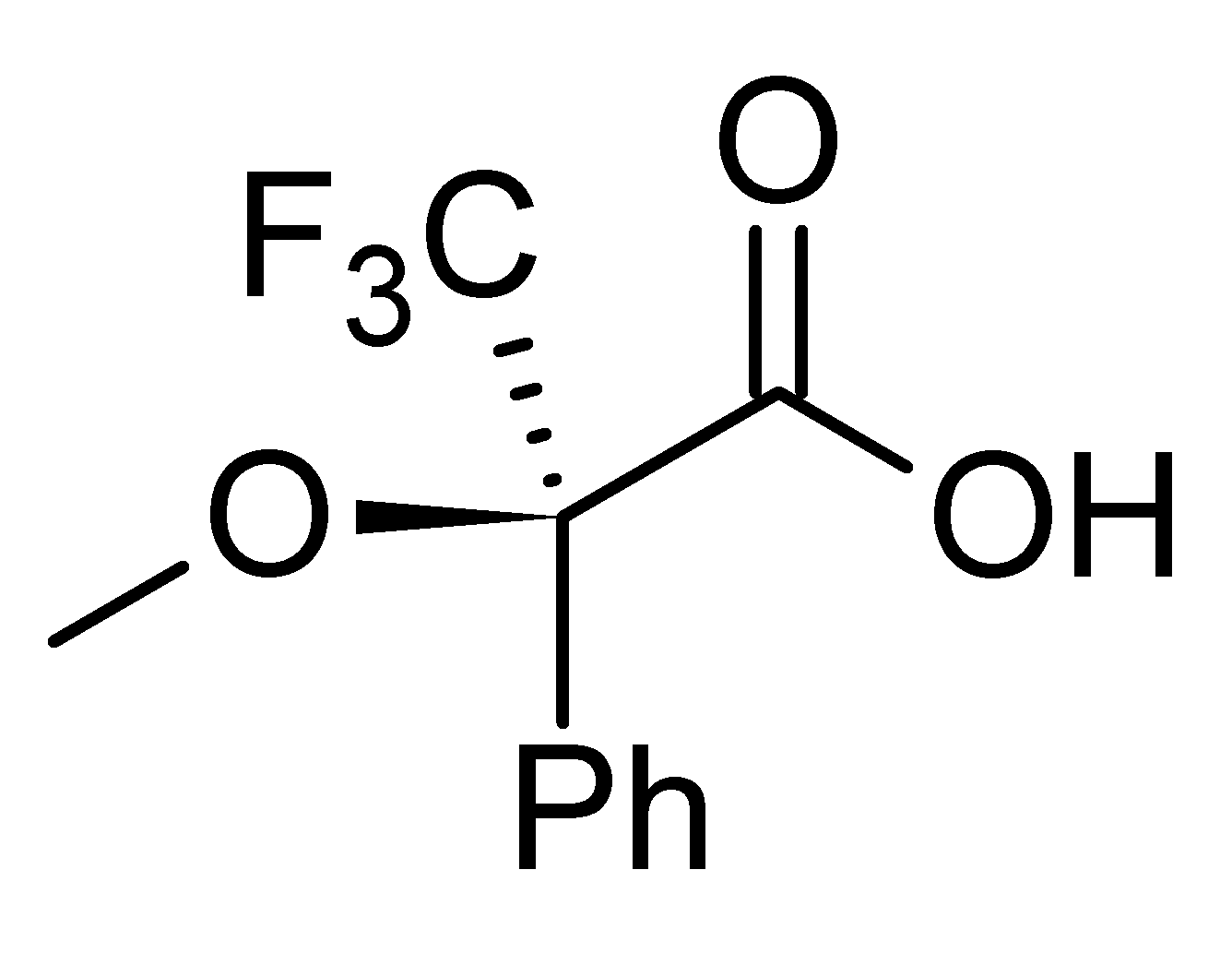
(R)-α-methoxy-α-(trifluoromethyl)- phenylacetic acid (Mosher's acid)

In analytical chemistry, a chiral derivatizing agent (CDA), also known as a chiral resolving reagent, is a derivatization reagent that is a chiral auxiliary used to convert a mixture of enantiomers into diastereomers in order to analyze the quantities of each enantiomer present and determine the optical purity of a sample. Analysis can be conducted by spectroscopy or by chromatography. Some analytical techniques such as HPLC and NMR, in their most commons forms, cannot distinguish enantiomers within a sample, but can distinguish diastereomers. Therefore, converting a mixture of enantiomers to a corresponding mixture of diastereomers can allow analysis. The use of chiral derivatizing agents has declined with the popularization of chiral HPLC. Besides analysis, chiral derivatization is also used for chiral resolution, the actual physical separation of the enantiomers.

== History ==
Since NMR spectroscopy has been available to chemists, there have been numerous studies on the applications of this technique. One of these noted the difference in the chemical shift (i.e. the distance between the peaks) of two diastereomers. Conversely, two compounds that are enantiomers have the same NMR spectral properties. It was reasoned that if a mix of enantiomers could be converted into a mix of diastereomers by bonding them to another chemical that was itself chiral, it would be possible to distinguish this new mixture using NMR, and therefore learn about the original enantiomeric mixture. The first popular example of this technique was published in 1969 by Harry S. Mosher. The chiral agent used was a single enantiomer of MTPA (α-methoxy-α-(trifluoromethyl)phenylacetic acid), also known as Mosher's acid. The corresponding acid chloride is also known as Mosher's acid chloride, and the resultant diastereomeric esters are known as Mosher's esters. Another system is Pirkle's alcohol, developed in 1977.

== Requirements ==
The general use and design of CDAs obey the following rules so that the CDA can effectively determine the stereochemistry of an analyte:

1. The CDA must be enantiomerically pure, or (less satisfactorily) its enantiomeric purity must be accurately known.
2. The reaction of the CDA with both enantiomers should go to completion under reaction conditions. This acts to avoid enrichment or depletion of one enantiomer of the analyte by kinetic resolution.
3. CDA must not racemize under derivatization or analysis conditions. Its attachment should be mild enough so that the substrate does not racemize either. If analysis is completed by HPLC, the CDA must contain a chromophore to enhance detectability.
4. If analysis is completed by NMR, the CDA should have a functional group that gives a singlet in the resultant NMR spectrum, where the singlet must be remote from other peaks.

== Mosher's method ==
Mosher's acid, via its acid chloride derivative, reacts readily with alcohols and amines to give esters and amides, respectively. The lack of an alpha-proton on the acid prevents loss of stereochemical fidelity under the reaction conditions. Thus, using an enantiomerically pure Mosher's acid allows for determination of the configuration of simple chiral amines and alcohols. For example, the (R)- and (S)-enantiomers of 1-phenylethanol react with (S)-Mosher acid chloride to yield (R,S)- and (S,S)-diastereomers, respectively, that are distinguishable in NMR.

== CFNA (alternative to Mosher's acid) ==
A newer chiral derivatizing agent (CDA), α-cyano-α-fluoro (2-naphthyl)-acetic acid (2-CFNA) was prepared in optically pure form by the chiral HPLC separation of a racemic 2-CFNA methyl ester. This ester was obtained by fluorination of methyl α-cyano (2-naphthyl) acetate with FClO3. 2-CFNA has been shown to be a superior CDA than Mosher's agent to determine the enantiomeric excess of a primary alcohol.

== Chromatography using CDAs ==
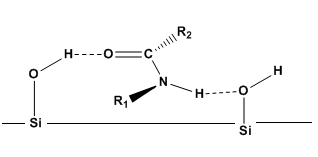
Amide on silica used as the model compound for Helmchen's Postulates.

Upon reaction of a CDA with the target analyte, chromatography can be used to separate the resulting products. In general, chromatography can be used to separate chiral compounds to bypass difficult crystallizations and/or to collect all diastereomer pairs in solution. Chromatography also has many variations (e.g. HPLC, gas chromatography, flash chromatography) with a wide array of applicability to diverse categories of molecules. The ability for CDAs to separate chiral molecules is dependent on two major mechanisms of chromatography:

1. Differential solvation in the mobile phase
2. Differential adsorption to the stationary phase

=== Helmchen's postulates ===
Helmchen's postulates are the theoretical models used to predict the elution order and extent of separation of diastereomers (including those formed from CDAs) that are adsorbed onto a surface. Although Helmchen's postulates are specific for amides on silica gel using liquid chromatography, the postulates provide fundamental guidelines for other molecules. Helmchen's Postulates are:

1. Conformations are the same in solution and when adsorbed.
2. Diastereomers bind to surfaces (silica gel in normal phase chromatography) mainly with hydrogen bonding.
3. Significant resolution of diastereomers is only expected when molecules can adsorb to silica through two contact points (two hydrogen bonds). This interaction can be perturbed by substituents.
4. Diastereomers with bulky substituents on the alpha carbon (R2) and on the nitrogen (R1) can shield the hydrogen bonding with the surface, thus the molecule will be eluted before similar molecules with smaller substituents.

Helmchen's postulates have been proven to be applicable to other functional groups such as: carbamates, esters, and epoxides.

=== Chiral stationary phases ===
Stationary phases can react with CDAs to form chiral stationary phases which can resolve chiral molecules. By reacting with alcohols on a silicate stationary phase, CDAs add a chiral center to the stationary phase, which allows for the separation of chiral molecules.

== CDAs in NMR spectroscopy ==
CDAs are used with NMR spectroscopic analysis to determine enantiomeric excess and the absolute configuration of a substrate. Chiral discriminating agents are sometimes difficult to distinguish from chiral solvating agents (CSA) and some agents can be used as both. The speed of the exchange between the substrate and the metal center is the most important determining factor to differentiate between the use of a compound as a CDA or CSA. Generally, a CDA has a slow exchange whereas a CSA has a fast exchange. CDAs are more widely used than CSAs to determine absolute configurations because the covalent bonding to the substrate and auxiliary reagent produce species with greater conformational rigidity which creates greater differences in the NMR spectra. CDAs and CSAs can be used together to improve chiral recognition, although this is not a common.

NMR shift reagents such as EuFOD, Pirkle's alcohol, and TRISPHAT take advantage of the formation of diastereomeric complexes between the shift reagent and the analytical sample.

=== Primary concerns when using CDAs ===
The primary concerns to take into consideration when using a CDA in NMR spectroscopy are kinetic resolution, racemization during the derivatization reaction and that the reagent should have 100% optical purity. Kinetic resolution is especially significant when determining optical purity, but it is somewhat negligible when the CDA is being used to assign the absolute configuration of an optically pure substrate. Kinetic resolution can be overcome using excess of the CDA. Racemization can occur to either the CDA or the substrate and in both cases it has the potential to significantly affect the results.

=== Strategies for NMR analysis ===
The two basic methods of NMR analysis are single- and double-derivatization. Double-derivatization is generally considered more accurate, but single-derivatization usually requires less reagents and, thus, is more cost effective.

==== Single-derivatization methods ====
The NMR spectrum of the product formed from the reaction of the substrate with a CDA at room temperature is compared with one of the following:

1. the spectrum for the same derivative when registered at lower temperature
2. the spectrum of the same derivative after forming a complex with a metal salt
3. the spectrum of the substrate without derivatization

==== Double-derivatization methods ====
Either the enantiomer of the substrate is derivatized with two enantiomers of the CDA or both enantiomers of the substrate are derivatized with one enantiomer of the CDA. Two diastereomers form in both cases and the chemical shifts of their nuclei are evaluated to assign the configuration of the substrate.

==== NMR techniques ====
The most common NMR techniques used when discriminating chiral compounds are ^{1}H-NMR, ^{19}F-NMR and ^{13}C-NMR. ^{1}H-NMR is the primary technique used to assign absolute configuration. ^{19}F-NMR is almost exclusive applied to optical purity studies, and ^{13}C-NMR is primarily used to characterize substrates that do not have protons that are directly bonded to an asymmetrical carbon atom.
