= Spontaneous absolute asymmetric synthesis =

Chemical phenomenon

Spontaneous absolute asymmetric synthesis is a chemical phenomenon that stochastically generates chirality based on autocatalysis and small fluctuations in the ratio of enantiomers present in a racemic mixture. In certain reactions which initially do not contain chiral information, stochastically distributed enantiomeric excess can be observed. The phenomenon is different from chiral amplification, where enantiomeric excess is present from the beginning and not stochastically distributed. Hence, when the experiment is repeated many times, the average enantiomeric excess approaches 0%. The phenomenon has important implications concerning the origin of homochirality in nature.
