= Charles Frederick Wurster =

American environmental activist

Charles Frederick Wurster Jr. (August 1, 1930 – July 6, 2023) was an American biochemist and environmental activist who was one of the founders of the Environmental Defense Fund (EDF) who were instrumental in the initiation of environmental law and legal action against the use of DDT. He was a professor emeritus at Stony Brook University.

== Education and career ==
A native Philadelphian, Wurster grew up in Olney, Philadelphia. He began his lifelong involvement in birdwatching when he was a teenager in high school. After high school education at Germantown Friends School, he graduated in 1952 with a bachelor's degree in chemistry from Haverford College. One summer during his youth, he worked in an Alaskan gold mine. After earning a master's degree in organic chemistry from the University of Delaware in 1954, he graduated in 1957 with a Ph.D. in organic chemistry from Stanford University. His thesis advisor was Harry Stone Mosher. For the academic year 1957–58, Wurster was a Fulbright Fellow in Innsbruck, Austria. Wurster was employed from 1959 to 1962 as a researcher by Monsanto and from 1962 to 1965 as a postdoctoral research at Dartmouth College. At Stony Brook University (SBU), he became an assistant professor in 1965 and retired in 1994 as professor emeritus in SBU's School of Marine and Atmospheric Sciences. In 2009, SBU awarded him an honorary degree. He was a visiting professor in Australia, Norway, and South Korea.

In 2015, Oxford University Press published Wurster's book about the DDT struggles during the 1960s and 1970s.

== Research, environmental activism, and public education ==
The research of Wurster and his collaborators provided scientific evidence for the environmental dangers caused by chlorinated hydrocarbon insecticides. He participated in, and reported on, government hearings that resulted in various bans against the use of DDT. After DDT bans prompted by groups such as the EDF, many bird species quickly recovered.

A 1969 paper on DDT residues in connection with fiddler crabs was coauthored by Wurster, George M. Woodwell, and William E. Odum (who was the first son of Eugene Odum).

In 1976 Wurster and Arthur P. Cooley suggested that, in many high school and college courses, students' writing of term papers might be replaced by students' writing of petitions. Such petitions to federal, state, or local governments might request changes in policies with environmentally harmful consequences. Wurster and Cooley argued that motivation of students can be enhanced by real-world projects — furthermore, writing petitions can teach the students about their rights and responsibilities as citizens and how to participate in government.

Wurster had many collaborators for his numerous scientific articles. R. George Rowland (1941–1990) was often one of Wurster's coauthors. In 1984, Wurster, Rowland, and Paul Lundy published a marine algal bioassay for detecting toxic chemical pollutants.

Wurster was a world class birder and leader for ornithology and ecology tours in the Arctic, Antarctic, Africa, and South America. He made an appearance in the NOVA television documentary Return of the Osprey, originally broadcast in the United States on March 18, 1986.

Wurster served on EDF's board of trustees for over 55 years. He also helped to establish the Environmental Defence Society in New Zealand and served on the board of trustees of the Defenders of Wildlife.

== Death ==
A lifelong asthmatic who never smoked, Wurster died at his daughter's home in Arlington, Virginia, from chronic obstructive pulmonary disease (COPD).

== Family ==
Wurster's first wife was Dorothy Hadley Burster-Hill (1932–2007), a cytogeneticist, an authority on the chromosomes of carnivores, and a faculty member in the Dartmouth Medical School's department of pathology. Before their divorce, Charles and Doris Wurster had a son Steven, who became a woodworker living in McCall, Idaho. Wurster's second wife was Eva Tank-Nielsen, a Norwegian diplomat. Before their divorce, they had a son Erik and a daughter Nina. Nina Wurster made her career in healthcare, but she and her children participate as volunteers for EcoAction Arlington. Erik Wurster became an expert in promoting sustainable energy projects. When Wurster died at age 92 in 2023, he was survived by his three children, four grandchildren, and his longtime companion Marie Gladwish, an artist and world traveler.

== Selected publications ==
- Durham, Lois J.; Wurster, Charles F.; Mosher, Harry S. (1958). "Peroxides. VIII. The Mechanism for the Thermal Decomposition of n-Butyl Hydroperoxide and n-Butyl 1-Hydroxybutyl Peroxide^{1}". Journal of the American Chemical Society. 80 (2): 332–337. Bibcode:1958JAChS..80..332D. doi:10.1021/ja01535a020.
- Wurster, Doris H.; Wurster, Charles F.; Strickland, Walter N. (1965). "Bird Mortality Following DDT Spray for Dutch Elm Disease". Ecology. 46 (4): 488–499. Bibcode:1965Ecol...46..488W. doi:10.2307/1934880. JSTOR 1934880.
- Woodwell, George M.; Wurster, Charles F.; Isaacson, Peter A. (1967). "DDT Residues in an East Coast Estuary: A Case of Biological Concentration of a Persistent Insecticide". Science. 156 (3776): 821–824. Bibcode:1967Sci...156..821W. doi:10.1126/science.156.3776.821. PMID 6022229.
- Wurster, Charles F.; Wingate, David B. (1968). "DDT Residues and Declining Reproduction in the Bermuda Petrel". Science. 159 (3818): 979–981. Bibcode:1968Sci...159..979W. doi:10.1126/science.159.3818.979. PMID 5635996.
- Wurster, Charles F. (1968). "DDT Reduces Photosynthesis by Marine Phytoplankton". Science. 159 (3822): 1474–1475. Bibcode:1968Sci...159.1474W. doi:10.1126/science.159.3822.1474. PMID 5732488.
- Mosser, Jerry L.; Fisher, Nicholas S.; Teng, Tzu-Chiu; Wurster, Charles F. (1972). "Polychlorinated Biphenyls: Toxicity to Certain Phytoplankters". Science. 175 (4018): 191–192. Bibcode:1972Sci...175..191M. doi:10.1126/science.175.4018.191. PMID 4621481.
- O'Connors, Harold B.; Wurster, Charles F.; Powers, C. Donald; Biggs, Douglas C.; Rowland, Ralph G. (1978). "Polychlorinated Biphenyls May Alter Marine Trophic Pathways by Reducing Phytoplankton Size and Production". Science. 201 (4357): 737–739. Bibcode:1978Sci...201..737O. doi:10.1126/science.97784. PMID 97784.
- McManus, George B.; Wyman, Kevin D.; Peterson, William T.; Wurster, Charles F. (1983). "Factors affecting the elimination of PCBs in the marine copepod Acartia tons". Estuarine, Coastal and Shelf Science. 17 (4): 421–430. Bibcode:1983ECSS...17..421M. doi:10.1016/0272-7714(83)90127-0.
