= Harry Stone Mosher =

American chemist

- Born: August 31, 1915; Salem, Oregon, United States
- Died: March 2, 2001 (aged 85); Stanford, California, United States
- Education: Willamette University, Pennsylvania State University
- Known for: Mosher's acid
- Scientific career
- Workplaces: Stanford University
- Doctoral advisor: Frank C. Whitmore
- Doctoral students: Charles Frederick Wurster

Harry Stone Mosher (August 31, 1915 – March 2, 2001) was an American chemist and the discoverer of Mosher's acid.

== Early life ==
Mosher attended Willamette University in Salem, Oregon, where he received a bachelor's degree in chemistry in 1937. He went on to Oregon State University, where he earned a master's degree in 1938. He then returned to Willamette to teach for one year. In 1939, he continued his graduate work at Pennsylvania State University under the mentorship of Frank C. Whitmore, a renowned organic chemist. In 1942, Mosher completed his PhD in organic chemistry. He remained at Pennsylvania State as an assistant professor, supervising research on synthetic anti-malarial drugs for the National Research Council and the production of DDT with the War Production Board. In 1944, Mosher married Carol Walker, a fellow chemistry graduate student at the university. Three years later, Mosher accepted an assistant professorship at Stanford University in the Department of Chemistry, and he and his wife moved to California for the position. That same year his wife Carol joined the staff of the Stanford Research Institute, later becoming senior organic chemist.

== Research contributions ==
While at Stanford, Mosher taught organic chemistry and conducted research in natural products chemistry and stereochemistry. He and his graduate student Melanchton Brown identified a deadly toxin produced by the California newt living in Stanford's Lake Lagunita, calling it tarichatoxin. They soon discovered that it was the same toxin produced by the puffer fish, used in a rare type of sushi that if prepared incorrectly could paralyze and kill human diners. Mosher determined the structure of the toxin, which is known as tetrodotoxin. Mosher worked on many other natural products including both plant pigments and toxic substances.

Mosher also invented the "Mosher reagent" or Mosher's acid, which is used to measure the degree of left- or right-handedness in organic molecules.

== Awards and honors ==
Mosher received an honorary doctoral degree from Willamette University. Harry Mosher served as chair of the California section of the American Chemical Society in 1955 and on the ACS National Council, both elected positions. In 1978, Mosher received the Abraham Ottenberg Service Award from the ACS. Two years later, the ACS established the Harry and Carol Mosher Award to advance the field of chemistry.

== Later life ==
Mosher retired from Stanford in 1981. He spent his later life engaged in tennis and skiing, and lunched regularly with his friends at the Rathskeller in the Stanford Faculty Club. He died in 2001, and was survived by his wife, their three children, and five grandchildren.
