= Ultraviolet–visible spectroscopy of stereoisomers =

Ultraviolet–visible spectroscopy (UV–vis) can distinguish between enantiomers by showing a distinct Cotton effect for each isomer. Molecules that are transparent with respect to UV–vis must be prepared for analysis by chemically adding a chromophore such as anthracene.

Two methods are reported: the octant rule and the exciton chirality method.

The octant rule was introduced in 1961 by William Moffitt, R. B. Woodward, A. Moscowitz, William Klyne and Carl Djerassi. This empirical rule allows the prediction of the sign of the Cotton effect by analysing relative orientation of substituents in three dimensions and in this way the absolute configuration of an enantiomer.

== See also ==
- NMR spectroscopy of stereoisomers
