= Nuclear magnetic resonance database method =

The nuclear magnetic resonance database method enables the identification of the stereochemistry of chiral molecules, especially polyols. It relies on the observation that NMR spectroscopy data depend only on the immediate environment near an asymmetric carbon, not on the entire molecular structure. All stereoisomers of a certain class of compounds are synthesized, and their proton NMR and carbon-13 NMR chemical shifts and coupling constants are compared. Yoshito Kishi's group at Harvard University has reported NMR databases for 1,3,5-triols 1,2,3-triols, 1,2,3,4-tetraols, and 1,2,3,4,5-pentaols.

The stereochemistry of any 1,2,3-triol may be determined by comparing it with the database, even if the remainder of the unknown molecule is different from the database template compounds.
