= Mosher's acid =

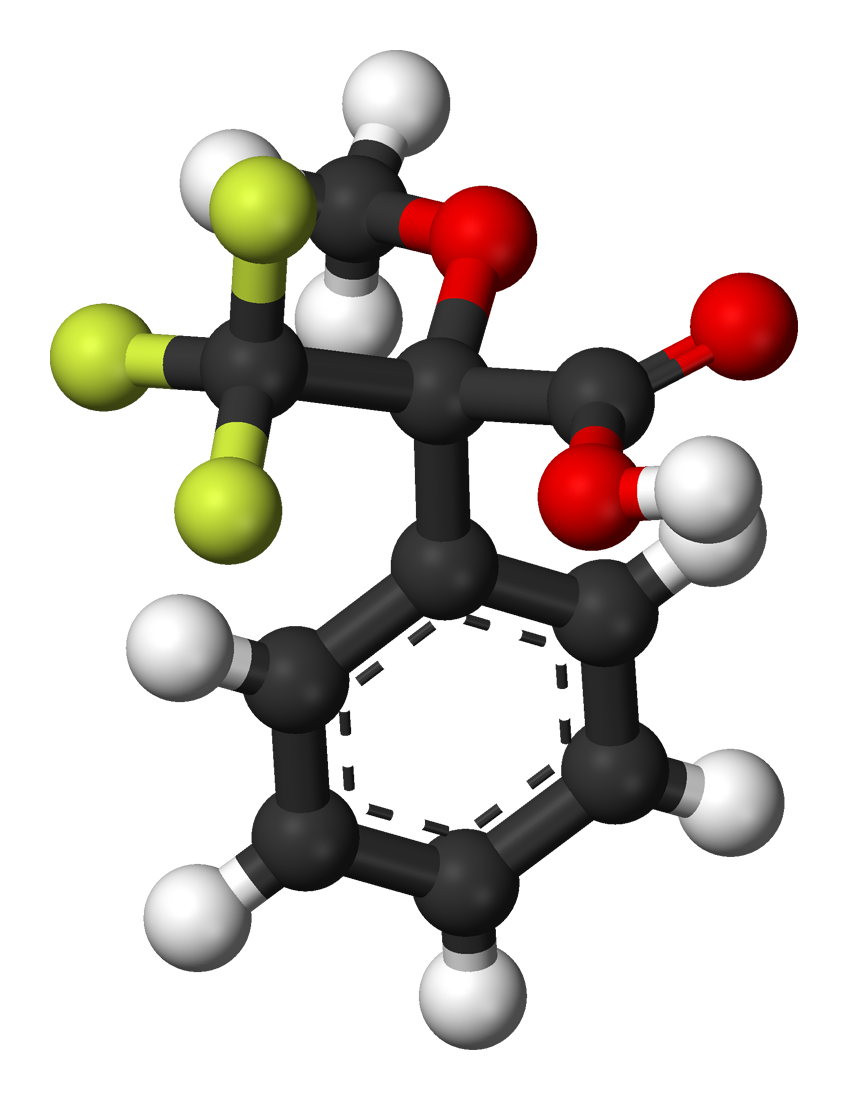

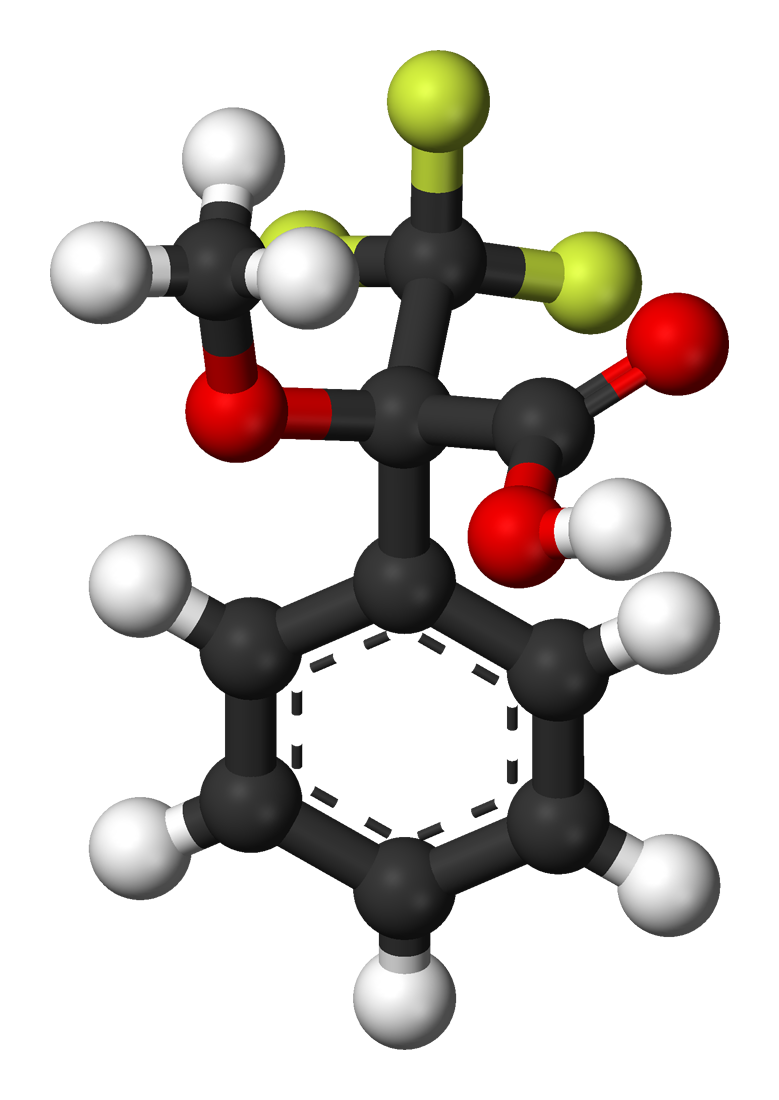

Names
- IUPAC names (R)-3,3,3-trifluoro-2-methoxy-2-phenylpropanoic acid (S)-3,3,3-trifluoro-2-methoxy-2-phenylpropanoic acid
- Other names Methoxy(trifluoromethyl)phenylacetic acid, MTPA

Identifiers
CAS Number	(racemic): 81655-41-6; (R): 20445-31-2; (S): 17257-71-5
3D model (JSmol)	Interactive image
ChemSpider	78043
ECHA InfoCard	100.153.604
EC Number	(R): 243-829-5; (S): 241-292-1
PubChem CID	(R): 2723917; (S): 6992788
UNII	(racemic): E015GCC0MA; (R): 27O5L9T1WM; (S): 172HCJ1IQV
CompTox Dashboard (EPA)	DTXSID90897007
- InChI: InChI=1S/C10H9F3O3/c1-16-9(8(14)15,10(11,12)13)7-5-3-2-4-6-7/h2-6H,1H3,(H,14,15) Key: JJYKJUXBWFATTE-UHFFFAOYSA-N; InChI=1/C10H9F3O3/c1-16-9(8(14)15,10(11,12)13)7-5-3-2-4-6-7/h2-6H,1H3,(H,14,15) Key: JJYKJUXBWFATTE-UHFFFAOYAJ
- SMILES: COC(C(O)=O)(c1ccccc1)C(F)(F)F

Properties
Chemical formula	C_{10}H_{9}F_{3}O_{3}
Molar mass	234.17
Appearance	solid
Melting point	46 to 49 °C (115 to 120 °F; 319 to 322 K)
Boiling point	105 to 107 °C (221 to 225 °F; 378 to 380 K) at 1 torr

Hazards
- GHS labelling
Pictograms	(GHS07: Exclamation mark)
Signal word	Warning
Hazard statements	H315, H319, H335
Precautionary statements	P261, P264, P271, P280, P302+P352, P304+P340, P305+P351+P338, P312, P321, P332+P313, P337+P313, P362, P403+P233, P405, P501
Flash point	110 °C (230 °F; 383 K)

Related compounds
Related acyl chloride	Mosher's acid chloride
- Except where otherwise noted, data are given for materials in their standard state (at 25 °C [77 °F], 100 kPa). verify (what is ?) Infobox references

Mosher's acid, or α-methoxy-α-trifluoromethylphenylacetic acid (MTPA) is a carboxylic acid which was first used by Harry Stone Mosher as a chiral derivatizing agent. It is a chiral molecule, consisting of R and S enantiomers.

== Applications ==
As a chiral derivatizing agent, it reacts with an alcohol or amine of unknown stereochemistry to form an ester or amide. The absolute configuration of the ester or amide is then determined by proton and/or ^{19}F NMR spectroscopy.

Mosher's acid chloride, the acid chloride form, is sometimes used because it has better reactivity.

An example of a drug that was chirally derivatized using Mosher's acid is called Sezolamide.

== See also ==
- Pirkle's alcohol
