= Urey–Bigeleisen–Mayer equation =

Isotope geochemistry modelling method

In stable isotope geochemistry, the Urey–Bigeleisen–Mayer equation, also known as the Bigeleisen–Mayer equation or the Urey model, is a model describing the approximate equilibrium isotope fractionation in an isotope exchange reaction. While the equation itself can be written in numerous forms, it is generally presented as a ratio of partition functions of the isotopic molecules involved in a given reaction. The Urey–Bigeleisen–Mayer equation is widely applied in the fields of quantum chemistry and geochemistry and is often modified or paired with other quantum chemical modelling methods (such as density functional theory) to improve accuracy and precision and reduce the computational cost of calculations.

The equation was first introduced by Harold Urey and, independently, by Jacob Bigeleisen and Maria Goeppert Mayer in 1947.

== Description ==
Since its original descriptions, the Urey–Bigeleisen–Mayer equation has taken many forms. Given an isotopic exchange reaction $A+B^*=A^*+B$, such that $^*$ denotes a molecule containing an isotope of interest, the equation can be expressed by relating the equilibrium constant, $K_{{eq}}$, to the product of partition function ratios, namely the translational, rotational, vibrational, and sometimes electronic partition functions. Thus the equation can be written as: $K_{eq} = \frac{[A^*][B]}{[A][B^*]}$ where $[A]=\prod^n Q_{n,A}$ and $Q_n$ is each respective partition function of molecule or atom $A$. It is typical to approximate the rotational partition function ratio as quantized rotational energies in a rigid rotor system. The Urey model also treats molecular vibrations as simplified harmonic oscillators and follows the Born–Oppenheimer approximation.

Isotope partitioning behavior is often reported as a reduced partition function ratio, a simplified form of the Bigeleisen–Mayer equation notated mathematically as $\frac{s}{s'}f$ or $(\frac{Q^*}{Q})_r$. The reduced partition function ratio can be derived from power series expansion of the function and allows the partition functions to be expressed in terms of frequency. It can be used to relate molecular vibrations and intermolecular forces to equilibrium isotope effects.

As the model is an approximation, many applications append corrections for improved accuracy. Some common, significant modifications to the equation include accounting for pressure effects, nuclear geometry, and corrections for anharmonicity and quantum mechanical effects. For example, hydrogen isotope exchange reactions have been shown to disagree with the requisite assumptions for the model but correction techniques using path integral methods have been suggested.

== History of discovery ==
One aim of the Manhattan Project was increasing the availability of concentrated radioactive and stable isotopes, in particular ^{14}C, ^{35}S, ^{32}P, and deuterium for heavy water. Harold Urey, Nobel laureate physical chemist known for his discovery of deuterium, became its head of isotope separation research while a professor at Columbia University. In 1945, he joined The Institute for Nuclear Studies at the University of Chicago, where he continued to work with chemist Jacob Bigeleisen and physicist Maria Mayer, both also veterans of isotopic research in the Manhattan Project. In 1946, Urey delivered the Liversidge lecture at the then-Royal Institute of Chemistry, where he outlined his proposed model of stable isotope fractionation. Bigeleisen and Mayer had been working on similar work since at least 1944 and, in 1947, published their model independently from Urey. Their calculations were mathematically equivalent to a 1943 derivation of the reduced partition function by German physicist Ludwig Waldmann. (Note: Bigeleisen & Mayer (1947) contains the addendum: After this paper had been completed, Professor W.F. Libby kindly called a paper by L. Waldmann to our attention. In this paper, Waldmann discusses briefly the fact that the chemical separation of isotopes is a quantum effect. He gives formulae which are equivalent to our (11') and (11a) and discusses qualitatively their application to two acid-base exchange equilibria. These are the exchange between NH_{3} and NH_{4}^{+} and HCN and CN^{–} studies by Urey and co-workers.)

== Applications ==
Initially used to approximate chemical reaction rates, models of isotope fractionation are used throughout the physical sciences. In chemistry, the Urey–Bigeleisen–Mayer equation has been used to predict equilibrium isotope effects and interpret the distributions of isotopes and isotopologues within systems, especially as deviations from their natural abundance. The model is also used to explain isotopic shifts in spectroscopy, such as those from nuclear field effects or mass independent effects. In biochemistry, it is used to model enzymatic kinetic isotope effects. Simulation testing in computational systems biology often uses the Bigeleisen–Mayer model as a baseline in the development of more complex models of biological systems. Isotope fractionation modeling is a critical component of isotope geochemistry and can be used to reconstruct past Earth environments as well as examine surface processes.

== See also ==
- Timeline of the Manhattan Project
- Isotope-ratio mass spectrometry
- Hydrogen isotope biogeochemistry
