= Göppert =

Göppert is a German language surname from the given name Gottfried. Notable people with it include:

- Friedrich Göppert (1870–1927), German paediatrician
- Heinrich Göppert (1800–1884), German botanist and paleontologist
- Maria Göppert-Mayer (1906–1972), German-born American theoretical physicist
