= Partition function =

Partition function may refer to:

- Partition function (statistical mechanics), a function used to derive thermodynamic properties
  - Rotational partition function, partition function for the rotational modes of a molecule
  - Vibrational partition function, partition function for the vibrational modes of a molecule
  - Partition function (quantum field theory), partition function for quantum path integrals
- Partition function (mathematics), generalization of the statistical mechanics concept
- Partition function (number theory), the number of possible partitions of an integer
