= Chemical species =

Substance composed of chemically identical molecular entities

A chemical species is a type of matter that displays a specific, uniquely identifying, set of properties. A systematic chemical name can be used to refer to a chemical species.

In practice, chemists identify chemical species by differentiating between features of molecular structure that affect the interactions between molecules of a species and between molecules of different species. From strongest to weakest, these include type of bonding (ionic, covalent, metallic), isotopic composition, and, in ultra-cold environments, even the hyperfine structure of molecules.

== Classification ==
Formally, a chemical species is a specific form of a chemical substance or chemically-identical molecular entities that has the same set of accessible energy levels over a specified timescale (i.e. over the course of an experiment). For example, water and iron have different chemical bonding (covalent intramolecular bonding with intermolecular forces vs metallic bonding) and atomic organizations (liquid vs solid) that control the way each of their atoms interact over the timescale we observe them, such that they are different chemical species.

From statistical mechanics we know that the microscopic interactions between molecules and within each molecule in a set of molecules determines the possible configurations that that set of molecules can reach. As a set of entities that have identical microscopic configurations, the constituent particles of a chemical species explore the same set of energy levels as a consequence of their identical microscopic chemical behaviors.

Common types of chemical species include atoms, molecules, radicals, supramolecular complexes, and chemically idential atomic or molecular structures in a solid compound, regardless of whether the chemical species is able to exist independently as their basic structural unit (e.g. water) or not (e.g. graphite). Chemical species are often labelled with a specific chemical name and formula.

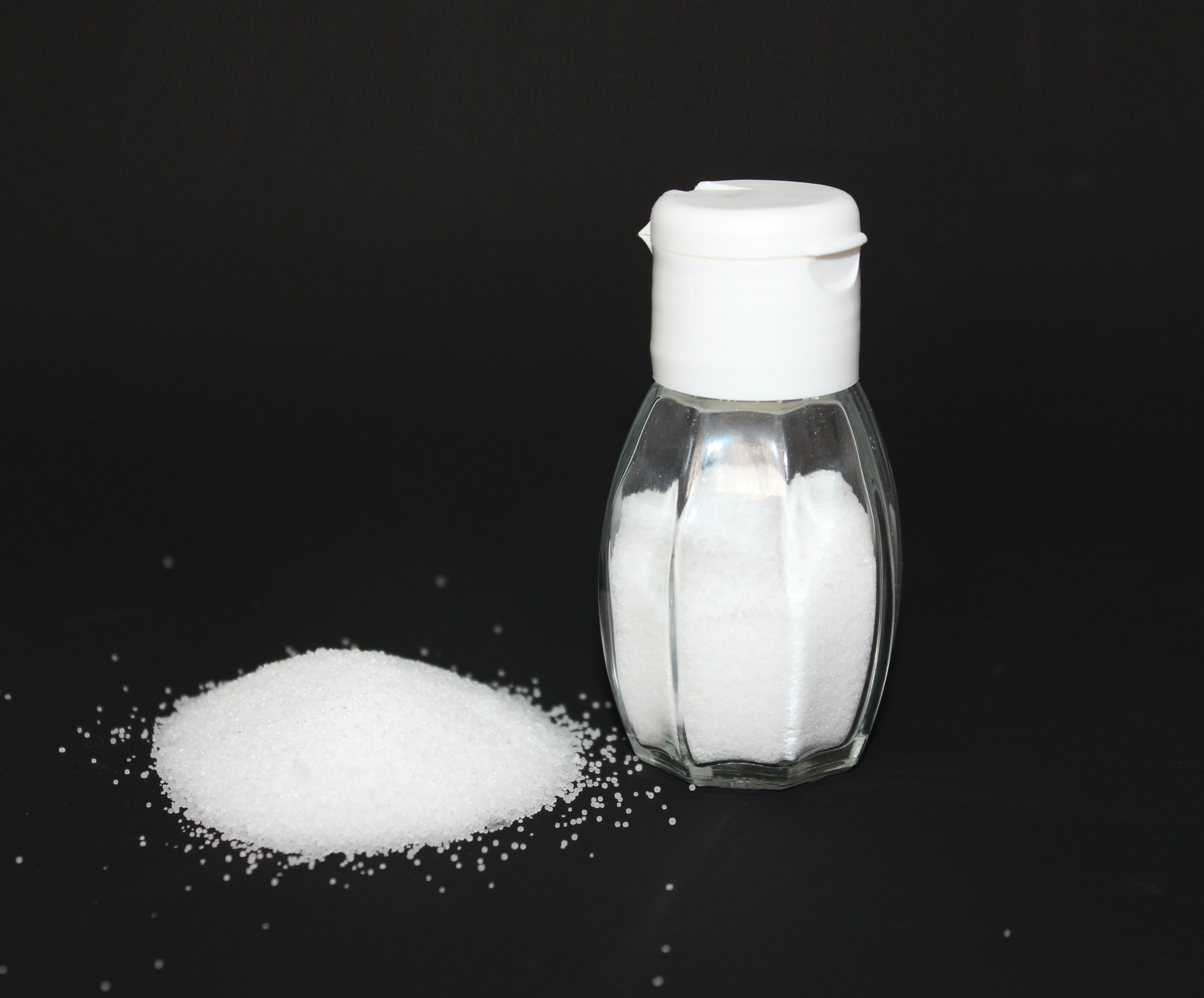
Table salt, formally sodium chloride (NaCl), is an example of a crystalline ionic chemical species. The crystal matrix of table salt is formed from two chemically distinct ions: Na^{+} and Cl^{-} each of which are also chemical species. Unless otherwise required by context, we assume that Na and Cl appear in their natural abundance ratio in these chemical species

Not all compounds referred to the same way are a chemical species, although a precise name can always be generated for each unique species. DNA is not a species because the name is generically applied to many molecules of different structures that can explore different energy configurations. Note that if one were to have many copies of the exact same sequence of base pairs of DNA, that specific sequence of DNA would be considered a chemical species. Similarly, the isotopes of uranium are distinct chemical species that can be separated, e.g. by centrifuges, despite having identical chemical reactivity.

=== Types of chemical species ===
Below some common types of chemical species are listed. Note that this list is by no means exhaustive. Often a chemical substance may be described as a specific chemical species for some experiment; however, if the experimental conditions were to change that former definition of chemical species may become nonsense. For examples, at high temperatures all isotopes of helium behave the same way at long timescales, so we can refer to there just being one species, "helium". However, at sufficiently low temperatures the different isotopes helium-3 and helium-4 display fundamentally different properties at the same timescales, so there must be two chemical species.

==== Atomic species ====
An atomic species is a specific form of an element defined by the atom's isotopic and electronic states. Argon, a noble gas, is an atomic species. Depending on the context, it may be important to distinguish between the isotopic states of argon, yielding a different definition of the relevant chemical species as each isotope, for example ^{40}Ar.

==== Molecular species ====
Molecular species are groups of atoms that are held together by chemical bonds. Examples include water (H_{2}O) and ozone (O_{3}).

==== Ionic species ====
Ionic species are atoms or molecules that have gained or lost electrons, resulting in a net electrical charge that can be either positively (cation) or negatively charged (anion).

Species with an overall positive charge are cationic. The sodium (I) (Na^{+}) is an example of a cationic species. Species with an overall negative charge will be an anionic species. Chloride (Cl^{−}) is an anionic species.

==== Radical species ====
Radical species are atoms or molecules with unpaired electrons. For example, the triarylborane anions is a class of radical species, with general formula is Ar_{3}B^{−}. Other common examples of radical species include singlet oxygen (O) formed by the photolysis of ozone in the upper atmosphere.

==== Supramolecular species ====
In supramolecular chemistry, chemical species are structures created by forming or breaking bonds between molecules, such as hydrogen bonding or dipole-dipole bonds. Examples include the structure of double-helix DNA, host-guest complexes used in pharmaceuticals, and metal-organic frameworks.

== See also ==
=== Empirical chemistry ===
- Chemical substance
- Chemical bonding
- Intermolecular forces
- Isomerism
- Physical Chemistry
- List of chemical classifications

=== Theoretical groundwork ===
- Partition function (statistical mechanics)
- Phase space
- Liouville theorem (Hamiltonian)
