= Galactosemia =

Metabolic disorder inhibiting the breakdown of galactose

- Galactose
- Specialty: Endocrinology

Galactosemia (British galactosaemia, from Ancient Greek γάλακτος (galaktos) 'milk' and αίμα (haima) 'blood') is a rare genetic metabolic disorder that affects an individual's ability to metabolize the sugar galactose properly. Galactosemia follows an autosomal recessive mode of inheritance that confers a deficiency in an enzyme responsible for adequate galactose degradation.

Friedrich Goppert (1870–1927), a German physician, first described the disease in 1917, with its cause as a defect in galactose metabolism being identified by a group led by Herman Kalckar in 1956. Galactosemia was the second disorder found to be detectable through newborn screening methods by Robert Guthrie.

Its incidence is about 1 per 60,000 births for people of European ancestry. In other populations the incidence rate differs. Galactosemia is about one hundred times more common (1:480 births) in the Irish Traveller population.

== Symptoms and signs ==
=== Adults ===
Galactosemia is generally diagnosed in neonates after symptoms are shown or during routine newborn screening. However, there have been rare cases of undiagnosed galactosemia in adults, usually presenting with developmental delay in addition to numerous other symptoms. Adults with galactosemia are at higher risk for cataracts (See: Galactosemic cataract), with a prevalence of 1 in 5. Adults with galactosemia are at a much greater risk for an anxiety disorder (prevalence of 1 in 2, or 50 percent) and a slightly elevated risk of depression (prevalence of 3 in 25, or 12 percent). They may also have ADHD, tremors, seizures or other neurological or psychological problems.

=== Infants ===
Infants may appear asymptomatic at birth; however, upon ingestion of galactose a few days later (via breast and/or formula feeding), children start to experience life-threatening symptoms, which include:

- poor feeding, and weight gain
- vomiting and diarrhea
- hepatocellular damage
- lethargy, and hypotonia
- congenital and/or infantile cataract formation

Progression of this acute neonatal toxicity syndrome may include the development of sepsis, cataracts, and even pseudotumor cerebri (which may cause a bulging of fontanelle).

=== Children ===
In children, untreated galactosemia can lead to cataracts, developmental delays, intellectual disabilities, speech difficulties, fine and gross motor difficulties, kidney disease, liver failure, sepsis, and premature ovarian insufficiency. While a child is being treated for galactosemia, they may continue to experience speech delays, learning disabilities, behavioral issues, ataxia, tremors, and hormone deficiencies.

== Cause ==
Lactose

Glucose

Galactose

Lactose in food (such as dairy products) is broken down by the enzyme lactase into glucose and galactose. In individuals with galactosemia, the enzymes needed for further metabolism of galactose (galactokinase and galactose-1-phosphate uridyltransferase) are severely diminished or missing entirely, leading to toxic levels of galactose or galactose 1-phosphate (depending on which enzyme is missing) in various tissues as in the case of classic galactosemia, resulting in hepatomegaly (an enlarged liver), cirrhosis, kidney failure, cataracts, vomiting, seizure, low blood sugar (hypoglycemia), lethargy, brain damage, and ovarian failure. Without treatment, mortality in infants with galactosemia is about 75%.

Galactosemia is inherited in an autosomal recessive manner, meaning a child must inherit one defective gene from each parent to show the disease. Heterozygotes are carriers, because they inherit one normal gene and one defective gene. Carriers show no symptoms of galactosemia.

== Accumulation of galactose ==
=== Reduction to galactitol ===
In galactosemic patients, the accumulation of galactose becomes the substrate for enzymes that catalyze the polyol pathway of carbohydrate metabolism. The first reaction of this pathway is the reduction of aldoses, types of sugars including galactose, to sugar alcohols. Recent data suggests that aldose reductase is the enzyme responsible for the primary stage of this pathway. Therefore, aldose reductase reduces galactose to its sugar alcohol form, galactitol. Galactitol, however, is not a suitable substrate for the next enzyme in the polyol pathway, polyol dehydrogenase. Thus, galactitol accumulates in body tissues and is excreted in the urine of galactosemic patients. Many of the negative effects of galactosemia have been attributed to accumulation of galactitol, and high concentrations of galactitol have been found in people with classic galactosemia (GALT deficiency or galactose-1-phosphate uridylyltransferase deficiency), galactokinase deficiency, and epimerase deficiency with glucose.

=== Oxidation to galactonate ===
Accumulated galactose can also undergo an alternative reaction: Oxidation to galactonate. The mechanism of galactonate formation is still unclear. However, recent studies suggest that galactose dehydrogenase is responsible for converting galactose to galactonolactone, which then spontaneously or enzymatically converts to galactonate. Once formed, galactonate may enter the pentose phosphate pathway. Thus, oxidation to galactonate serves as an alternate pathway for metabolizing galactose. This oxidative pathway renders accumulated galactonate less harmful than accumulated galactitol.

== Diagnosis ==
In many states throughout the world, infants routinely undergo newborn screening (NBS) for galactosemia. This allows a diagnosis to be made while the person is still an infant. Affected children can have serious, irreversible effects or even die within days from birth. Infants affected by galactosemia typically present with symptoms of lethargy, vomiting, diarrhea, failure to thrive, and jaundice. None of these symptoms are specific to galactosemia, often leading to diagnostic delays. If the family of the baby has a history of galactosemia, doctors can test prior to birth by taking a sample of fluid from around the fetus (amniocentesis) or from the placenta (chorionic villus sampling or CVS). Galactosemia is normally first detected through newborn screening which if available, is able to diagnose the majority of affected infants.

A galactosemia test is a blood test (from the heel of the infant) or urine test that checks for three enzymes that are needed to change galactose sugar that is found in milk and milk products into glucose, a sugar that the human body uses for energy. A person with galactosemia does not have one of these enzymes. This causes high levels of galactose in the blood or urine.

Galactosemia can be detected through NBS before any ingestion of galactose-containing formula or breast milk. Detection of the disorder through NBS does not depend on protein or lactose ingestion, and, therefore, it should be identified on the first specimen unless the infant has been transfused. A specimen should be taken prior to transfusion. The enzyme is prone to damage if analysis of the sample is delayed or exposed to high temperatures. The routine NBS is accurate for detection of galactosemia. Two screening tests are used to screen infants affected with galactosemia—the Beutler's test and the Hill test. The Beutler's test screens for galactosemia by detecting the level of enzyme of the infant. Therefore, the ingestion of formula or breast milk does not affect the outcome of this part of the NBS, and the NBS is accurate for detecting galactosemia prior to any ingestion of galactose.

Duarte galactosemia is a milder form of classical galactosemia and usually has no long term side effects.

=== Types ===
Galactose is converted into glucose by the action of three enzymes, known as the Leloir pathway. There are diseases associated with deficiencies of each of these three enzymes:

Type	Diseases Database	OMIM	Gene	Locus	Enzyme	Name
Type 1	5056	230400	GALT	9p13	galactose-1-phosphate uridylyltransferase	classic galactosemia
Type 2	29829	230200	GALK1	17q24	galactokinase	galactokinase deficiency
Type 3	29842	230350	GALE	1p36-p35	UDP galactose epimerase	galactose epimerase deficiency, UDP-Galactose-4-epimerase deficiency

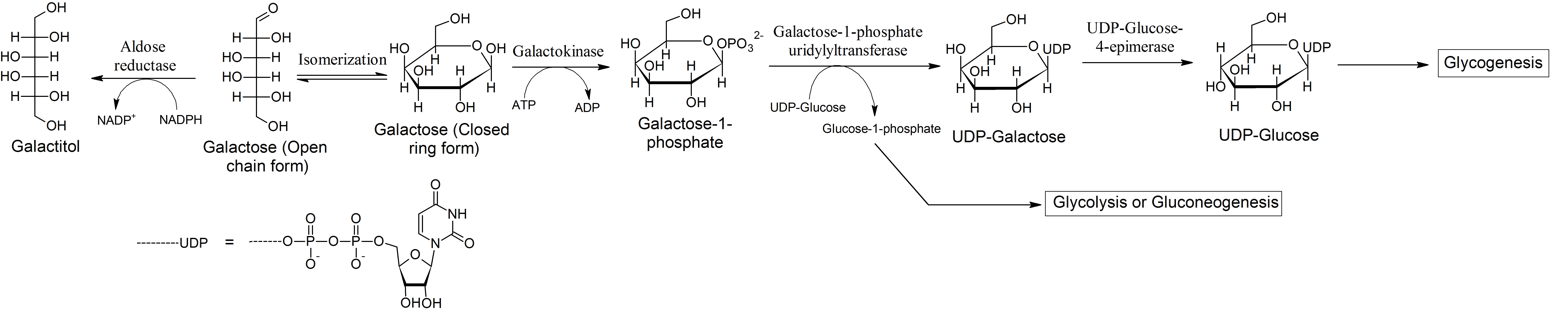
Normal metabolic pathway for galactose in humans

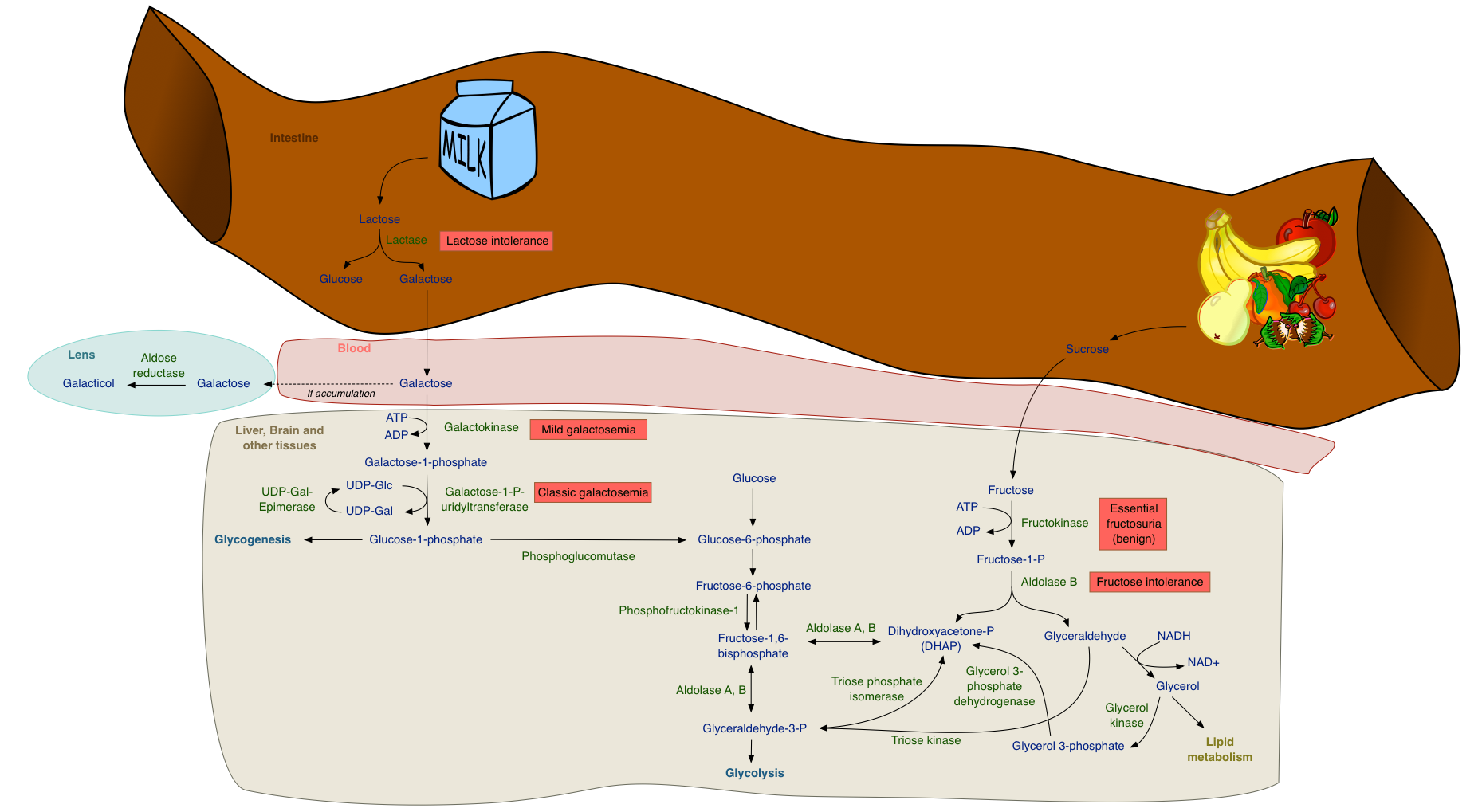
Galactose metabolism

== Treatment ==
The only treatment for classic galactosemia is eliminating lactose and galactose from the diet (e.g. exclusion of dairy products containing lactose).

Lactose-restricted diet is efficient in resolving acute complications; however, it is not sufficient to prevent long-term complications affecting the brain and female gonads. Some individuals may experience long-term complications such as speech difficulties, learning disabilities, neurological impairment (e.g. tremors, etc.), and ovarian failure.

Symptoms that have not been associated with Duarte galactosemia, and many individuals with Duarte galactosemia do not need to restrict their diet at all. However, research corroborates a previously overlooked theory that Duarte galactosemia may lead to language developmental issues in children with no clinical symptoms. Infants with classic galactosemia cannot be breast-fed due to lactose in human breast milk which consists of both galactose and glucose and are usually fed a soy-based formula.

Galactosemia is sometimes confused with lactose intolerance, but galactosemia is a more serious condition. Lactose intolerant individuals have an acquired or inherited shortage of the enzyme lactase, and experience abdominal pains after ingesting dairy products, but no long-term effects. In contrast, a galactosemic individual who consumes galactose can have serious complications including:

- Speech deficits
- Ataxia
- Dysmetria
- Diminished bone density
- Premature ovarian failure
- Cataract

== See also ==
- Galactosemic cataract
- Other Inborn errors of carbohydrate metabolism
- Irish travellers
