= Vibrational temperature =

The vibrational temperature is commonly used in thermodynamics, to simplify certain equations. It has units of temperature and is defined as

$$\theta_\text{vib}= \frac {h \tilde{\nu} c}{k_\text{B}} = \frac{h\nu}{k_\text{B}}$$

where $k_\text{B}$ is the Boltzmann constant, $c$ is the speed of light, $\tilde{\nu}$ is the wavenumber, and $\nu$ (Greek letter nu) is the characteristic frequency of the oscillator.

The vibrational temperature is used commonly when finding the vibrational partition function.

Molecule	$\tilde{\nu}$	$\theta_{vib}$
N_{2}	2446 cm^{−1}	3521 K
O_{2}	1568 cm^{−1}	2256 K
F_{2}	917 cm^{−1}	1320 K
HF	4138 cm^{−1}	5957 K
HCl	2991 cm^{−1}	4303 K

== See also ==
- Rotational temperature
- Rotational spectroscopy
- Vibrational spectroscopy
- Infrared spectroscopy
- Spectroscopy
