= Galactosemic cataract =

Clouding of the eye's lens due to excess galactose in the blood

- Specialty: Ophthalmology

A galactosemic cataract is cataract which is associated with the consequences of galactosemia, a deficiency in the body's ability to break down the sugar galactose.

== Types ==
The presence of presenile cataract, noticeable in galactosemic infants as young as a few days old, is highly associated with two distinct types of galactosemia: GALT deficiency and to a greater extent, GALK deficiency.

An impairment or deficiency in the enzyme, galactose-1-phosphate uridyltransferase (GALT), results in classic galactosemia, or Type I galactosemia. Classic galactosemia is a rare (1 in 47,000 live births), autosomal recessive disease that presents with symptoms soon after birth when a baby begins lactose ingestion. Symptoms include life-threatening illnesses such as jaundice, hepatosplenomegaly (enlarged spleen and liver), hypoglycemia, renal tubular dysfunction, muscle hypotonia (decreased tone and muscle strength), sepsis (presence of harmful bacteria and their toxins in tissues), and cataract among others. The prevalence of cataract among classic galactosemics is markedly less than among galactokinase-deficient patients due to the extremely high levels of galactitol found in the latter. Classic galactosemia patients typically exhibit urinary galactitol levels of only 98 to 800 mmol/mol creatine compared to normal levels of 2 to 78 mmol/mol creatine.

Galactokinase (GALK) deficiency, or Type II galactosemia, is also a rare (1 in 100,000 live births), autosomal recessive disease that leads to variable galactokinase activity levels: ranging from high GALK efficiency to undetectably-low GALK efficiency. The early onset of cataract is the main clinical manifestation of Type II galactosemics, most likely due to the high concentration of galactitol found in this population. GALK deficient patients exposed to high-galactose diets show extreme levels of galactitol in blood and urine. Studies on galactokinase-deficient patients have shown that nearly two-thirds of ingested galactose can be accounted for by galactose and galactitol levels in the urine. Urinary levels of galactitol in these subjects approach 2500 mmol/mol creatine as compared to 2 to 78 mmol/mol creatine in control patients. A decrease in activity in the third major enzymes of galactose metabolism, UDP-galactose 4′-epimerase (GALE), is the cause of Type III galactosemia. GALE deficiency is an extremely rare, autosomal recessive disease that appears to be most common among the Japanese population (1 in 23,000 live births among Japanese population). While the link between GALE deficiency and cataract prevalence seems to be ambiguous, experiments on this topic have been conducted. A recent 2000 study at the Dr. von Hauner Children's Hospital of LMU Klinikum in Munich, Germany analyzed the activity levels of the GALE enzyme in various tissues and cells in patients with cataract. The experiment concluded that while patients with cataract seldom exhibited an acute decrease in GALE activity in blood cells, "the GALE activity in the lens of cataract patients was, on the other hand, significantly decreased". The study's results are depicted below. The extreme decrease in GALE activity in the lens of cataract patients seems to suggest an irrefutable connection between Type III galactosemia and cataract development.

=== Galactosemia ===
Galactosemia is one of the most mysterious of the heavily-researched metabolic diseases. It is a hereditary disease that results in a defect in, or absence of, galactose-metabolizing enzymes. This inborn error leaves the body unable to metabolize galactose, allowing toxic levels of galactose to build up in human body blood, cells, and tissues. Although treatment for galactosemic infants is a strict galactose-free diet, endogenous (internal) production of galactose can cause symptoms such as long-term morbidity, presenile development of cataract, renal failure, cirrhosis, and cognitive, neurologic, and female reproductive complications. Galactosemia used to be confused with diabetes due to the presence of sugar in a patient's urine. However, screening advancements have allowed the exact identity of those sugars to be determined, thereby distinguishing galactosemia from diabetes.

== Mechanism ==
A cataract is an opacity that develops in the crystalline lens of the eye. The word cataract literally means, "curtain of water" or "waterfall" as rapidly running water turns white, so the term may have been used metaphorically to describe the similar appearance between mature ocular opacities and water fall. The mechanism by which galactosemia causes cataract is not well understood, but the topic has been approached by researchers for decades, notably by the ophthalmologists, Jonas S. Friedenwald and Jin H. Kinoshita. Through this collective effort, a general mechanism for galactosemia's causation of presenile cataract has come into form.

=== Galactitol's harmful influence ===
In galactosemic cataracts, osmotic swelling of the lens epithelial cells (LEC) occurs. Osmosis is the movement of water from areas of low particle concentration to areas of high particle concentration, to establish equilibrium. Researchers concluded that this osmotic swelling must be the result of an accumulation of abnormal metabolites or electrolytes in the lens. Ruth van Heyningen was the first to discover that the lens's retention of dulcitol, synonymous for galactitol, induces this osmotic swelling in the galactosemic cataract. However, galactose concentration must be fairly high before the enzyme, aldose reductase, will convert significant amounts of the sugar to its galactitol form. As it turns out, the lens is a favorable site for galactose accumulation. The lens phosphorylates galactose at a relatively slow pace in comparison to other tissues. This factor, in combination with the low activity of galactose-metabolizing enzymes in galactosemic patients, allows for the accumulation of galactose in the lens. Aldose reductase is able to dip into this galactose reservoir and synthesize significant amounts of galactitol. As is mentioned above, galactitol is not a suitable substrate for the enzyme, polyol dehydrogenase, which catalyzes the next step in the carbohydrate metabolic cycle. Thus, the sugar alcohol idly begins to accumulate in the lens.

=== Ensuing osmotic pressure ===
As galactitol concentration increases in the lens, a hypertonic environment is created. Osmosis favors the movement of water into the lens fibers to reduce the high osmolarity. Figures 2 and 3 show how water concentration increases as galactitol concentration increases inside the lens of galactosemic animals sustained on a galactose diet. This osmotic movement ultimately results in the swelling of lens fibers until they rupture. Vacuoles appear where a significant amount of osmotic dissolution of fiber has taken place. What are left are interfibrillar clefts filled with precipitated proteins: the manifestation of a cataract. Friedenwald was able to show that periphery lens fibers always dissolve before fibers at the equatorial region of the lens. This observation has been confirmed by more recent experiments as well, but is still unexplained. The progression of galactosemic cataract is generally divided into three stages; initial vacuolar, late vacuolar, and nuclear cataract. The formation of a mature, nuclear, cloudy galactosemic cataract typically surfaces 14 to 15 days after the onset of the galactose diet. Fig. 6 depicts the three stages of galactosemic cataract with their respective changes in lens hydration.

=== Changes in lens that accompany galactitol accumulation and osmotic swelling ===
As cataract formation progresses due to galactitol synthesis and subsequent osmotic swelling, changes occur in the lens epithelial cells. For instance, when rabbit lenses are placed in high-galactose mediums, a nearly 40% reduction in lens amino acid levels is observed, along with significant ATP reduction as well. Researchers theorized that this reduction in amino acid and ATP levels during cataract formation is a result of osmotic swelling. To test this theory, Kinoshita placed rabbit lenses in a high-galactose environment, but inhibited the osmotic swelling by constantly regulating galactose and galactitol concentrations. The results show that amino acid levels remained relatively constant and in some cases even increased.

Thus, from these experiments it would appear that the loss of amino acids in the lens when exposed to galactose is primarily due to the osmotic swelling of the lens brought about by dulcitol [galactitol] retention.

Galactosemic patients will also present with amino aciduria and galactitoluria (excessive levels of amino acids and galactitol in the urine).

Osmotic swelling of the lens is also responsible for a reduction in electrolyte concentration during the initial vacuolar stage of galactosemic cataract. The water that is osmotically flowing into the lens fibers is not accompanied by ions such as Na^{+}, K^{+}, and Cl^{−}, and so the electrolyte concentration inside the lens is simply diluted by the influx of water. The net concentration of the individual ions does not change during the initial vacuolar stage however. In Fig. 7, note the decrease in electrolyte concentration due to osmotic swelling during the initial vacuolar stage of galactosemic cataract. But when comparing it to the dry weight of the ions, note that there is no change in individual ion concentration at this stage. However, Kinoshita's experiments showed a remarkable upswing in electrolyte concentration toward the latter stages of the galactosemic cataract and in the nuclear stage in particular. This observation seems to be explained by the continuous increase in lens permeability due to the osmotic swelling from galactitol accumulation. Cation and anion distribution becomes erratic, with Na^{+} and Cl^{−} concentrations increasing while K^{+} concentration decreases as seen in Figures 8 and 9. Researchers have postulated that as the cataractous lens loses its ability to maintain homeostasis, electrolyte concentration eventually increases within the lens, which further encourages osmotic movement of water into the lens fibers, increasing lens permeability even more so. This damaging cycle may play a pivotal role in accelerating the rupture of lens fibers during the most advanced, nuclear stage of the galactosemic cataract.

== Treatment ==
Galactosemic infants present clinical symptoms just days after the onset of a galactose diet. They include difficulty feeding, diarrhea, lethargy, hypotonia, jaundice, cataract, and hepatomegaly (enlarged liver). If not treated immediately, and many times even with treatment, severe mental deficiencies, verbal dyspraxia (difficulty), motor abnormalities, and reproductive complications may ensue. The most effective treatment for many of the initial symptoms is complete removal of galactose from the diet. Breast milk and cow's milk should be replaced with soy alternatives. Infant formula based on casein hydrolysates and dextrin maltose as a carbohydrate source can also be used for initial management, but are still high in galactose. The reason for long-term complications despite a discontinuation of the galactose diet is vaguely understood. However, it has been suggested that endogenous (internal) production of galactose may be the cause.

The treatment for galactosemic cataract is no different from general galactosemia treatment. In fact, galactosemic cataract is one of the few symptoms that is actually reversible. Infants should be immediately removed from a galactose diet when symptoms present, and the cataract should disappear and visibility should return to normal. Aldose reductase inhibitors, such as sorbinil, have also proven promising in preventing and reversing galactosemic cataracts. AR inhibitors hinder aldose reductase from synthesizing galactitol in the lens, and thus restricts the osmotic swelling of the lens fibers. Other AR inhibitors include the acetic acid compounds zopolrestat, tolrestat, alrestatin, and epalrestat. Many of these compounds have not been successful in clinical trials due to adverse pharmokinetic properties, inadequate efficacy and efficiency, and toxic side effects. Testing on such drug-treatments continues in order to determine potential long-term complications, and for a more detailed mechanism of how AR inhibitors prevent and reverse the galactosemic cataract.

== Research ==
Although advancement has been slow to come during the decades of research dedicated to the galactosemic cataract, some notable additions have been made. In 2006, Michael L. Mulhern and colleagues further investigated the effects of the osmotic swelling on galactosemic cataract development. Experiments were based on systematic observation of rats fed a 50% galactose diet. According to Mulhern, 7 to 9 days after the onset of the galactose diet, lenses appeared hydrated and highly vacuolated. Lens fibers became liquefied after nine days of the diet, and nuclear cataract formation appeared after 15 days of the diet.

The experiment concluded that

Apoptosis in lens epithelial cells (LEC) is linked to cataract formation.

Essentially, the study suggested that the mechanism outlined by Friedenwald and Kinoshita, which centers on osmotic swelling of the lens fibers, is just the beginning in a cascade of events that causes and progresses the galactosemic cataract. Mulhern determined that osmotic swelling is actually a cataractogenic stressor that leads to LEC apoptosis. This is because osmotic swelling of lens fibers considerably strains LEC endoplasmic reticula. As the endoplasmic reticulum is the principal site of protein synthesis, stressors on the ER can cause proteins to become misfolded. The subsequent accumulation of misfolded proteins in the ER activates the unfolded protein response (UPR) in LECs. In agreement, it was later observed on galactosemic yeast models, the activation of UPR upon galactose treatment. UPR initiates apoptosis, or cell death, by various mechanisms, one of which is the release of reactive oxygen species (ROS). Thus, according to recent findings, osmotic swelling, UPR, oxidative damage, and the resultant LEC apoptosis all play key roles in the onset and progression of the galactosemic cataract. Other studies claim that the oxidative damage in LECs is less a result of the release of ROS and more because of the competition between aldose reductase and glutathione reductase for nicotinamide adenine dinucleotide phosphate (NADPH). Aldose reductase requires NADPH for the reduction of galactose to galactitol, while glutathione reductase utilizes NADPH to reduce glutathione disulfide (GSSG) to its sulfhydryl form, GSH. GSH is an important cellular antioxidant. Therefore, what exactly the key roles are for these cataractogenic factors is not yet fully understood or agreed upon by researchers. Recently, it has been shown that the intake of milk (lactose and galactose) in human diet does not seem to be a cause of cataract.

== See also ==
- Metabolic disorder
