= Jacob Bigeleisen =

American chemist

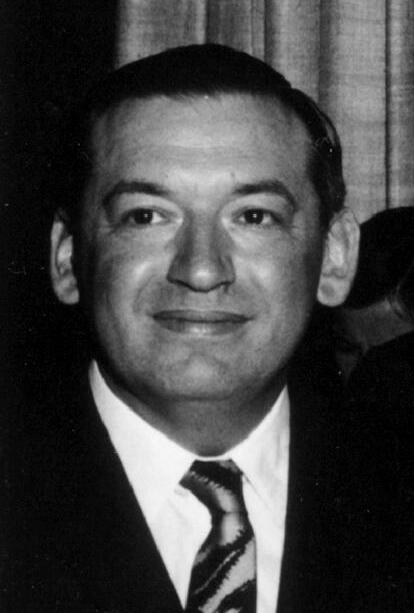
- Bigeleisen in 1964
- Born: Jacob Bigeleisen; May 2, 1919; Paterson, New Jersey, US
- Died: August 7, 2010 (aged 91); Arlington, Virginia, US
- Education: New York University (AB 1939); Washington State College (MS 1941); University of California, Berkeley (PhD 1943)
- Known for: Bigeleisen-Mayer equation
- Awards: Guggenheim Fellowship (1974), WSU Regents' Distinguished Alumnus Award (1983), American Chemical Society Award for Nuclear Applications in Chemistry, E.O. Lawrence Award
- Scientific career
- Fields: Chemistry
- Workplaces: Columbia University; Ohio State University; University of Chicago; Brookhaven National Laboratory; University of Rochester; State University at Stony Brook

Jacob Bigeleisen (pronounced BEEG-a-lie-zen; May 2, 1919 – August 7, 2010) was an American chemist who worked on the Manhattan Project on techniques to extract uranium-235 from uranium ore, an isotope that can sustain nuclear fission and would be used in developing an atomic bomb but that is less than 1% of naturally occurring uranium. While the method of using photochemistry that Bigeleisen used as an approach was not successful in isolating useful quantities of uranium-235 for the war effort, it did lead to the development of isotope chemistry, which takes advantage of the ways that different isotopes of an element interact to form chemical bonds.

== Biography ==
Bigeleisen was born on May 2, 1919, in Paterson, New Jersey. He graduated in 1935 from Eastside High School, where he was one of less than 200 of 1,200 students who took a rigorous classical curriculum. His mother wanted him to go to college and a friend suggested that he study chemistry, noting that Paterson's dye companies that served the textile plants there would always need chemists. He attended the University College of New York University in the Bronx, earned a master's degree in 1941 from Washington State College in Pullman (since renamed as Washington State University), and was awarded a doctorate in 1943 from the University of California, Berkeley.

=== Manhattan Project ===
He became part of the Manhattan Project at Columbia University, where he worked on methods to achieve the separation of the uranium-235 needed to complete an atomic bomb using the enriched uranium, from the more plentiful, but non-fissile, isotope uranium-238, which constitutes more than 99% of uranium ore. The method of photochemistry that Bigeleisen researched did not lead to an effective method of separating the uranium isotopes, and gaseous diffusion and methods that took advantage of the electromagnetic properties of uranium proved to be more effective means of isotope separation. Bigeleisen's research led to the development of isotope chemistry based on the principle that heavier isotopes formed stronger chemical bonds allowing for the creation of a straightforward theory to explain the progress of chemical reactions through the interaction of isotopes in gaseous form, which he did together with Maria Goeppert-Mayer, who would later win the Nobel Prize in Physics. This research allowed chemists to gain a better understanding of a chemical reaction by using different isotopes to analyze the differing reaction rates, thereby fostering for advances in chemical physics, geochemistry and molecular biology. Bigeleisen developed the basic theories of the effect of isotopic substitution on chemical equilibrium (equilibrium isotope effect) and on reaction rates (kinetic isotope effect).

Research he did in collaboration with Harold Urey that studied the varying levels of isotopes of oxygen in marine fossils allowed for the determination of the water temperature that prevailed while the animals were alive.

He did research at Ohio State University and the University of Chicago after the war. He was hired in 1948 by the Brookhaven National Laboratory, before moving to the University of Rochester in 1968 and to the State University at Stony Brook in 1978. He was elected a member of the National Academy of Sciences in 1966 and a Fellow of the American Academy of Arts and Sciences in 1968. In 1974, he was awarded a Guggenheim Fellowship.

In an address in March 1983 at Washington State University at ceremonies where he was awarded the college's Distinguished Alumnus Award, Bigeleisen advocated on behalf of nuclear disarmament, saying that "we have to stop putting our efforts into building more and more bombs" and that the time had come to start dismantling the tens of thousands of nuclear warheads in the nation's stockpile. Though he said that he didn't regret his participation in the Manhattan Project, Bigeleisen stated that "having lived through that time, that any further use of nuclear weapons is out of the question."

=== Death ===
Bigeleisen died at age 91 on August 7, 2010, in Arlington, Virginia due to pulmonary disease. He was survived by his wife, Grace, as well as by three sons and six grandchildren.
