= Goeppert-Mayer (crater) =

Crater on Venus

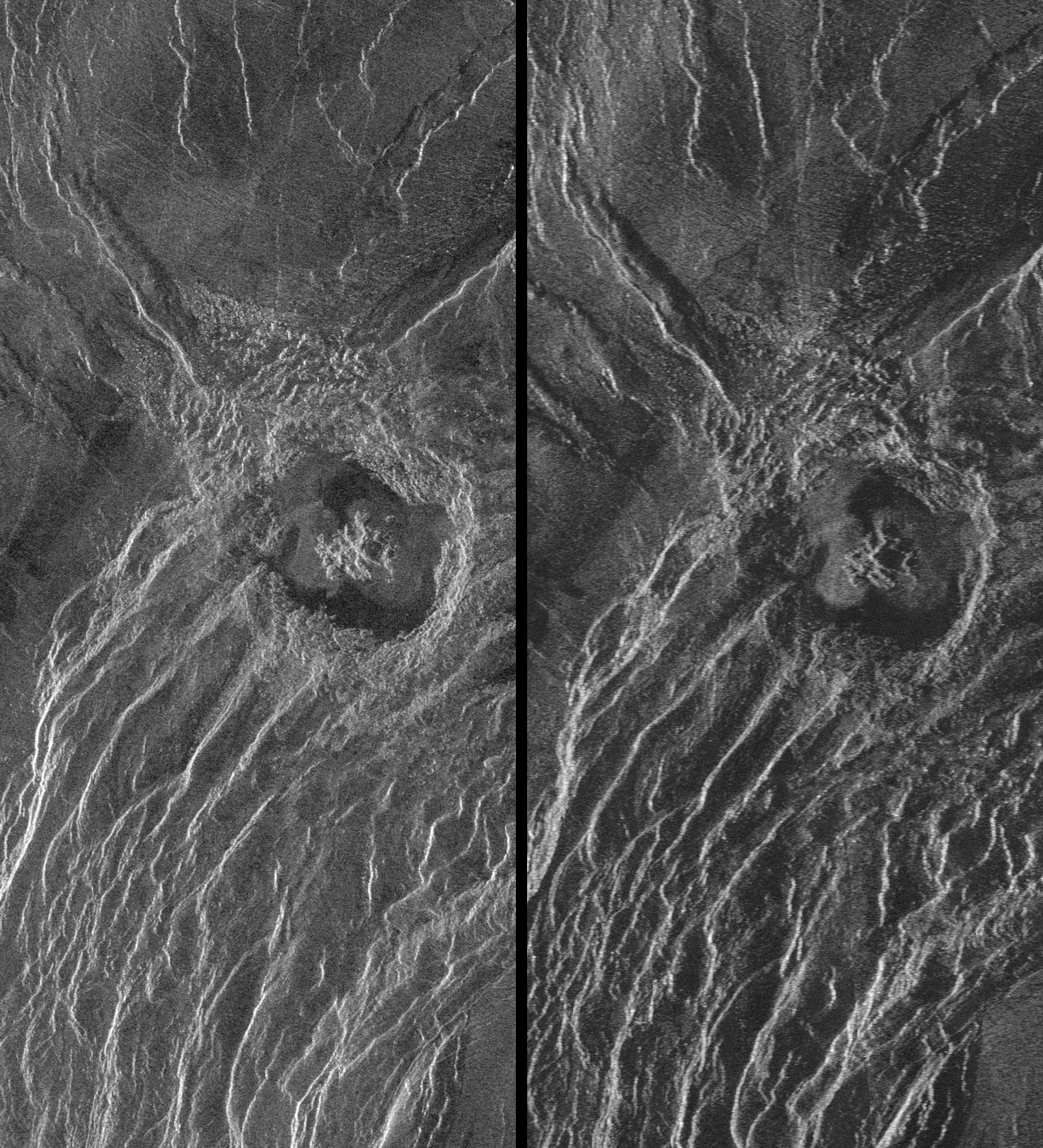
- Stereo radar images by Magellan
- Location: Venus
- Coordinates: 59.7°N 26.8°E
- Diameter: 33.5 km (20.8 mi)
- Eponym: Maria Goeppert-Mayer

Goeppert-Mayer is a crater on the planet Venus. It was named in 1991 after German physicist and Nobel laureate Maria Goeppert-Mayer.

It is 35 kilometers (22 mi) in diameter and lies above an escarpment at the edge of a ridge belt in Southern Ishtar Terra. West of the crater the scarp has more than one kilometer (0.6 miles) of relief.
