= Rotational temperature =

The characteristic rotational temperature (θ_{R} or θ_{rot}) is commonly used in statistical thermodynamics to simplify the expression of the rotational partition function and the rotational contribution to molecular thermodynamic properties. It has units of temperature and is defined as

$$\theta_{\mathrm{R}} = \frac{hc \overline{B}}{k_{\mathrm{B}}} = \frac{\hbar^2}{2k_{\mathrm{B}}I},$$

where $\overline{B} = B/hc$ is the rotational constant, I is a molecular moment of inertia, h is the Planck constant, c is the speed of light, ħ = h/2π is the reduced Planck constant and k_{B} is the Boltzmann constant.

The physical meaning of θ_{R} is as an estimate of the temperature at which thermal energy (of the order of k_{B}T) is comparable to the spacing between rotational energy levels (of the order of hcB). At about this temperature the population of excited rotational levels becomes important. Some typical values are given in the table. In each case the value refers to the most common isotopic species.

Molecule	$\theta_{\mathrm{R}}$ (K)
H_{2}	87.6
N_{2}	2.88
O_{2}	2.08
F_{2}	1.27
HF	30.2
HCl	15.2
CO_{2}	0.561
HBr	12.2
CO	2.78

== See also ==
- Rotational spectroscopy
- Vibrational temperature
- Vibrational spectroscopy
- Infrared spectroscopy
- Spectroscopy
