= Boris Jacobsohn =

American physicist

Boris Abbott Jacobsohn (July 30, 1918, New York City – December 26, 1966) was an American physicist, known for his contributions to the study of muonic atoms.

== Life ==
Jacobsohn graduated from Columbia University with B.S. in 1938 and M.S in 1939. At the beginning of the Manhattan Project, he worked with Enrico Fermi at Columbia. Jacobsohn, along with his wife Ruth, moved with Fermi's team in early 1942 to the University of Chicago for the team's relocation to the Metallurgical Laboratory, where he worked until the end of WWII. In late 1945, Edward Teller invited Maria Goeppert-Mayer, along with her two students Boris Jacobsohn and Harris Mayer, to Los Alamos to work on the development of the thermonuclear bomb. For this work, Jacobsohn received, in 1947 after declassification of the research, his Ph.D. from the University of Chicago with thesis under the supervision of Edward Teller. For the academic year 1947–1948, Jacobsohn was an instructor at Stanford University. In 1948 he became an assistant professor in the physics department of the University of Washington. There he was appointed a full professor in 1959 and remained until he died of a heart attack on a skiing vacation.

He was the author of theoretical publications in astrophysics, nuclear physics, elementary particles, magnetism and many-body physics. His early contributions to the study of muonic atoms are still of great importance. He was also known for his theoretical studies of tests for time reversal invariance in strong and electromagnetic interactions.

In 1961 Jacobsohn was elected a Fellow of the American Institute of Physics. After his death, a fund was established to annually bring a distinguished physicist, elected by vote of the graduate students in the physics department, to the University of Washington as Boris A. Jacobsohn Memorial Lecturer.
