= Richard M. Goody =

British-American atmospheric physicist (1921–2023)

Richard Mead Goody
- Born: 19 June 1921; Hertfordshire, England
- Died: 3 August 2023 (aged 102); Cockeysville, Maryland, U.S.
- Citizenship: British, American
- Education: University of Cambridge (BA, PhD)
- Awards: Member of the National Academy of Sciences since 1970 and of the American Philosophical Society since 1997, American Geophysical Union's William Bowie Medal in 1998
- Scientific career
- Fields: Atmospheric physics, meteorology
- Workplaces: Harvard University
- Patrons: National Science Foundation
- Thesis: Radiative heat exchange in the lower stratosphere (1949)
- Doctoral advisor: Gordon Sutherland
- Notable students: Richard Lindzen, Andrew Ingersoll

Richard Mead Goody (19 June 1921 – 3 August 2023) was a British-American atmospheric physicist and professor of planetary physics at Harvard University. He was inducted into the National Academy of Sciences in 1970.

== Early life and education ==
A native of Hertfordshire, Goody attended Cambridge University, from which he received a bachelor's degree in physics in 1942. He then worked at the Aeroplane and Armament Experimental Establishment until October 1946, when he returned to Cambridge to receive his PhD, doing so in 1949. While there, he was instructed to build an infrared spectrometer for use in an airplane to measure stratospheric dryness. He also made important discoveries into the structure of the stratosphere during this time, which led him to study radiative transfer in planetary atmospheres.

Related to this work, the best known and widely used model of absorption bands in atmospheric opacity is due to the work of Goody in 1952, and the model was initially known as the Goody random model. It was later discovered that Harris Mayer's work under the supervision of Edward Teller at Los Alamos National Laboratory published in 1947 had made similar calculations and many sources now call the model the Mayer-Goody model or the Mayer-Goody statistical model.

== Scientific career ==
Goody was appointed the Abbott Lawrence Rotch Professor of Dynamic Meteorology and director of the Blue Hill Observatory at Harvard in 1958 and elected into the American Academy of Arts and Sciences the following year. He became a US citizen in 1965. His 1964 book Atmospheric Radiation has been described as "classic". He served as the director of the Blue Hill Observatory until 1970, and the chair of the Space Studies Board of the National Academy of Sciences from 1974 to 1976.

In 1970, Goody was the co-chair of a National Academy of Sciences study of Venus entitled "Venus: Strategy for Exploration", and he was partly responsible for launching the Pioneer Venus project, which launched probes to Venus in 1978. He underwent compulsory retirement from Harvard in 1991. Goody was elected to the American Philosophical Society in 1997.

== Death ==
Goody died on 3 August 2023, at the age of 102.
