= Harris Mayer =

American physicist (1921–2023)

- Born: Harris Louis Mayer; February 15, 1921; New York, U.S.
- Died: September 17, 2023 (aged 102)
- Scientific career
- Fields: Physics, mathematics

Harris Louis Mayer (February 15, 1921 – September 17, 2023) was an American physicist known for his collaboration with Edward Teller and John von Neumann. He worked on the Manhattan Project. Mayer also worked on Project Orion. His work had to do with opacity, mostly in the context of atmospheric opacity to nuclear radiation.

== Early work ==
In late 1945, Harris Mayer was a student of Maria Goeppert-Mayer (wife of chemist Joseph Edward Mayer and neither of whom had any relation to Harris). Edward Teller invited Maria Goeppert-Mayer and two of her students (Boris Jacobsohn and Harris Mayer) to the Los Alamos National Laboratory. Mayer's early work at the lab had to do with the development of the thermonuclear bomb. The bomb was not a part of the main mission of the Los Alamos Lab, but volunteers among the scientists became involved. Mayer wrote a history of the lab in this era where he describes his contribution as the calculations of the equations of state and radiative transfer opacities.

=== Problem of opacity ===
The problem of opacity in the bomb was based on a concern that low opacity will allow radiation to escape rapidly giving the bomb less energy and a slower buildup of pressure during the explosion. This, "low opacity" would mean a more efficient bomb. While this did not greatly matter in fission bombs, it was very important in connection with hydrogen bombs where the transfer of energy between the fission and fusion devises is important. Teller presented the idea that the absorption of radiation was different at high and low frequencies, at high frequencies all frequencies are absorbed, but at lower frequencies absorption occurs more specifically at specific lines and allows more energy transfer, and Mayer carried out many of the related calculations. Opacity is generally calculated based on average opacities using Planck or Rosseland opacity functions. However, these averages generalize many one-electron transitions that can take place in a large number of atomic bound electron configurations. Harris' work was the first to calculate opacity including the full effects of line absorption.

Edward Teller wrote in 1955 that Mayer worked with another student, John Reitz, and that they were supervised by Teller and by Frank Hoyt, a professor at the University of Chicago. Teller emphasizes how the efforts of Teller and others during World War II were sustained by these scientists joining the lab at Los Alamos. The calculations of Mayer and Reitz were carried to conclusion by another student, Marshall Rosenbluth. Mayer was granted a PhD based on this work once it was declassified after the war. A bonus of Harris' participation was that his father was a distributor of liquor, and had access to more alcohol than was generally available due to rations during World War II.

The best-known and most widely used model of absorption bands in atmospheric opacity is due to the work of Richard M. Goody in 1952, and the model was initially known as the Goody random model. It was later discovered that Mayer's work at Los Alamos, which was published in 1947, had made similar calculations. Many sources therefore now call the model the Mayer-Goody model or the Mayer-Goody statistical model. Mayer, however, stated that he believed the model should most properly be credited to Teller. Arthur N. Cox developed a method for computing stellar opacity that was also influential and was based primarily on Mayer's 1947 work, which Mayer initially called the "Mayer Independent Electron" method for calculations at high temperatures and the "Ionic" method at lower temperatures.

Mayer also participated in field experiments for post-war nuclear tests on Parry Island.

== Orion Project and later work ==
In 1958, Mayer was hired as a consultant on the Orion Project. His contribution included working with Freeman Dyson and Rosenbluth to help estimate the opacity of the propellant and its effect on the propellant's potential power.

Later in his career, Mayer studied how space tethers could be used for propulsion in space similar to gravity assists but with objects without a significant gravitational pull.

== Death ==
Harris Mayer died on September 17, 2023, at the age of 102.

== Documentaries ==
- Mayer was interviewed in the documentary To Mars by A-Bomb: The Secret History of Project Orion

== Key works ==
- Mayer, Harris, "Methods of Opacity Calculations" Los Alamos Scientific, Laboratory Report, LA 647 (October 1947)
- Penzo, P. A., and Mayer, H. L., "Tethers and Asteroids for Artificial Gravity Assist in the Solar System." Journal of Spacecraft and Rockets. Vol. 23, No. 1 (Jan.-Feb. 1986).
