= Translational partition function =

Physical function in thermodynamics

In statistical mechanics, the translational partition function, $q_T$ is that part of the partition function resulting from the movement (translation) of the center of mass. For a single atom or molecule in a low pressure gas, neglecting the interactions of molecules, the canonical ensemble $q_T$ can be approximated by:

$q_T = \frac{V}{\Lambda^3}\,$ where $\Lambda = \frac{h}{\sqrt{2\pi m k_B T }}$

Here, V is the volume of the container holding the molecule (volume per single molecule so, e.g., for 1 mole of gas the container volume should be divided by the Avogadro number), Λ is the Thermal de Broglie wavelength, h is the Planck constant, m is the mass of a molecule, k_{B} is the Boltzmann constant and T is the absolute temperature. This approximation is valid as long as Λ is much less than any dimension of the volume the atom or molecule is in. Since typical values of Λ are on the order of 10-100 pm, this is almost always an excellent approximation.

When considering a set of N non-interacting but identical atoms or molecules, when Q_{T} ≫ N , or equivalently when ρ Λ ≪ 1 where ρ is the density of particles, the total translational partition function can be written

$$Q_T(T,N) = \frac{ q_T(T)^N }{N!}$$

The factor of N! arises from the restriction of allowed N particle states due to Quantum exchange symmetry. Most substances form liquids or solids at temperatures much higher than when this approximation breaks down significantly.

== See also ==
- Rotational partition function
- Vibrational partition function
- Partition function (mathematics)
