= Friedrich Göppert =

German paediatrician

Friedrich Göppert (25 October 1870 – 9 February 1927) was a German paediatrician who worked at the University of Göttingen from 1910 to 1927. He was the first to describe Galactosemia.

== Life and career ==
Friedrich Göppert was born in Kattowitz on 25 October 1870. His grandfather was the botanist and palaeontologist Heinrich Göppert; his father was a notable lawyer and an advisor to the Prussian Minister of Culture. All four of his brothers worked in the national or state civil service. He studied medicine at the University of Heidelberg and the University of Berlin, and obtained his doctorate in medicine in Breslau in 1896. He then worked as an assistant at the children's clinics in Berlin, working under Otto Heubner, and Breslau, where he was an assistant to Adalbert Czerny.

From 1900 to 1909 Göppert worked as a paediatrician in Kattowitz. In 1909, he went to the University of Kiel to study under Wilhelm von Starck, but before he could complete his habilitation he was appointed associate professor for paediatrics at the University of Göttingen. He became a full professor in 1919, and remained there until his death in 1927. He was the father of Maria Goeppert Mayer, who won the Nobel Prize in Physics in 1963.

Göppert was the first to describe the disease Galactosemia, in a paper published in 1917. Its cause as a defect in galactose metabolism was later identified by a group led by Herman Kalckar in 1956. Other papers described calcium therapy and treatments for dysentery, and he wrote a book on diphtheria.

Göppert died on 9 February 1927, in Berlin, where he had gone to a sanatorium to recover from a persistent weakness that he was feeling.

== Works ==
- Grundlegende Studien über die Genickstarre anlässlich der Erforschung der in Oberschlesien herrschenden Epidemie, 1905
- Die Nasen-, Hals- und Ohrenkrankheiten des Kindes in der täglichen Praxis, 1914
- Prophylaxe und Therapie der Kinderkrankheiten, 1920
- Diphtherie, 1925 (Bergmanns Handbuch Band 1)
