= Hill test =

Arms and ankles blood pressure

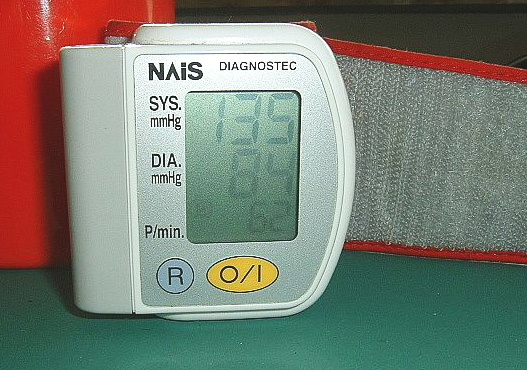
- BP device
- Purpose: the measurement of systolic blood pressure

Hill test or Hill’s test is the measurement of systolic blood pressure both in arms and ankles. If the difference in pressure is more than 20 mmHg it suggests aortic insufficiency, a valvular heart disease. Measuring the pressure in femoral arteries will not develop the same results, as the bouncing pressure of the blood in aortic regurgitation will fade down when travelling from thigh to the ankles.
