= Maria Goeppert Mayer =

German–American physicist (1906–1972)

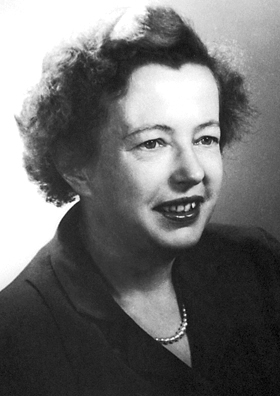
- Goeppert Mayer in 1963
- Born: Maria Göppert; June 28, 1906; Kattowitz, German Empire
- Died: February 20, 1972 (aged 65); San Diego, California, U.S.
- Resting place: El Camino Memorial Park
- Education: University of Göttingen (PhD)
- Known for: Nuclear shell model; Double beta decay; Two-photon absorption
- Spouse: Joseph Edward Mayer (m. 1930)
- Children: 2
- Father: Friedrich Göppert
- Relatives: Donat Wentzel (son-in-law)
- Awards: Nobel Prize in Physics (1963)
- Scientific career
- Fields: Physics
- Workplaces: Johns Hopkins University; Sarah Lawrence College; Los Alamos Laboratory; University of Chicago; Argonne National Laboratory; University of California, San Diego
- Thesis: Über Elementarakte mit zwei Quantensprüngen (1931)
- Doctoral advisor: Max Born
- Notable students: Boris Jacobsohn; Harris Mayer; Robert Sachs

Maria Goeppert Mayer (German: [maˈʁiːa ˈɡœpɐt ˈmaɪɐ]; née Göppert; June 28, 1906 – February 20, 1972) was a German–American theoretical physicist who shared the 1963 Nobel Prize in Physics with J. Hans D. Jensen and Eugene Wigner. One half of the prize was awarded jointly to Goeppert Mayer and Jensen "for their discoveries concerning nuclear shell structure." She was the second woman to win the Nobel Prize in Physics, the first being Marie Curie in 1903. In 1986, the Maria Goeppert-Mayer Award for early-career women physicists was established in her honor.

A graduate of the University of Göttingen, Goeppert Mayer wrote her doctoral thesis on the theory of possible two-photon absorption by atoms. At the time, the chances of experimentally verifying her thesis seemed remote, but the development of the laser in the 1960s later permitted this. Today, the unit for the two-photon absorption cross section is called the Goeppert Mayer (GM) unit.

Maria Goeppert married American chemist Joseph Edward Mayer and moved to the United States, where he was an associate professor at Johns Hopkins University. Strict rules against nepotism prevented Johns Hopkins University from taking her on as a faculty member, but she was given a job as an assistant and published a landmark paper on double beta decay in 1935. In 1937, she moved to Columbia University, where she took an unpaid position. During World War II, she worked for the Manhattan Project at Columbia on isotope separation, and with Edward Teller at the Los Alamos Laboratory on the development of thermonuclear weapons.

After the war, Goeppert Mayer became a voluntary Associate Professor of Physics at the University of Chicago (where her husband and Teller worked) and a senior physicist at the university-run Argonne National Laboratory. She developed a mathematical model for the structure of nuclear shells, for which she was awarded the Nobel Prize in Physics in 1963. In 1960, she was appointed Full Professor of Physics at the University of California, San Diego.

== Early life and education ==
Maria Göppert was born on June 28, 1906, in Kattowitz (now Katowice, Poland), Kingdom of Prussia, German Empire, the only child of Maria (née Wolff) and Friedrich Göppert. In 1910, she moved with her family to Göttingen, where her father, a sixth-generation university professor, was appointed Professor of Pediatrics at the University of Göttingen. She was closer to her father than to her mother; "Well, my father was more interesting", she later explained; "He was after all a scientist".

Göppert was educated at the Höhere Technische in Göttingen, a school for middle-class girls who aspired to higher education. In 1921, she entered the Frauenstudium, a private high school run by suffragettes that aimed to prepare girls for university. She took the Abitur, the university entrance examination, at age 17, a year early, with three or four girls from her school and thirty boys. All the girls passed, but only one of the boys did.

In the spring of 1924, Göppert entered the University of Göttingen, where she studied mathematics. She spent one year at the University of Cambridge in England, before returning to Göttingen. A purported shortage of women mathematics teachers for schools for girls led to an upsurge of women studying mathematics at a time of high unemployment, and there was even a female professor of mathematics at Göttingen, Emmy Noether, but most were only interested in qualifying for their teaching certificates.

Göppert became interested in physics, and chose to pursue a Doctor of Philosophy instead. In her 1931 thesis, she worked out the theory of possible two-photon absorption by atoms. Eugene Wigner later described the thesis as "a masterpiece of clarity and concreteness". At the time, the chances of experimentally verifying her thesis seemed remote, but the development of the laser permitted the first experimental verification in 1961, when two-photon-excited fluorescence was detected in a europium-doped crystal. To honor her fundamental contribution to this area, the unit for the two-photon absorption cross-section is named the "GM". One GM is 10^{−50} cm^{4} s photon^{−1}. Her examiners were three Nobel Prize winners: Max Born, James Franck, and Adolf Otto Reinhold Windaus (in 1954, 1925, and 1928, respectively).

== United States ==
On January 19, 1930, Göppert married Joseph Edward Mayer, an American Rockefeller fellow who was one of James Franck's assistants. The two had met when Mayer had boarded with the Göppert family. The couple moved to Mayer's home country of the United States, where he had been offered a position as Associate Professor of Chemistry at Johns Hopkins University in Maryland. They had two children; Maria Ann, who later married Donat Wentzel, and Peter Conrad.

Strict rules against nepotism prevented Johns Hopkins University from hiring Goeppert Mayer as a faculty member. These rules, created at many universities to prevent patronage, had by this time lost their original purpose and were primarily used to prevent the employment of women married to faculty members. She was given a job as an assistant in the physics department working with German correspondence, for which she received a very small salary, a place to work and access to the facilities. She taught some courses, and published an important paper on double beta decay in 1935.

Some [schools] even condescended to give her work, though they refused to pay her, and the topics were typically 'feminine', such as figuring out what causes colors … the University of Chicago finally took her seriously enough to make her a professor of physics. Although she got her own office, the department still didn't pay her … When the Swedish academy announced in 1963 that she had won her profession's highest honor, the San Diego newspaper greeted her big day with the headline "S.D. Mother Wins Nobel Prize".

There was little interest in quantum mechanics at Johns Hopkins, but Goeppert Mayer worked with Karl Herzfeld in this area. They collaborated on a number of papers, including a paper with Herzfeld's student A. L. Sklar on the spectrum of benzene. She also returned to Göttingen in the summers of 1931, 1932 and 1933 to work with her former examiner Born, writing an article with him for the Handbuch der Physik. This ended when the Nazi Party came to power in 1933, and many academics, including Born and Franck, lost their jobs. Concerned by the 1933 anti-Jewish laws that ousted professors of Jewish descent, Goeppert-Mayer as well as Herzfeld became involved in refugee relief efforts.

Joe Mayer was fired in 1937. He attributed this to the hatred of women on the part of the dean of physical sciences, which he thought was provoked by Goeppert Mayer's presence in the laboratory. Herzfeld agreed and added that, with Goeppert-Mayer, Franck and Herzfeld all at Johns Hopkins, some thought that there were too many German scientists there. There were also complaints from some students that Mayer's chemistry lectures contained too much modern physics. Mayer took up a position at Columbia University, where the chairman of the physics department, George B. Pegram, arranged for her to have an office, but she received no salary. She soon made good friends with Harold Urey and Enrico Fermi, who arrived at Columbia in 1939, with the three of them and their families living in nearby Leonia, New Jersey. Fermi asked her to investigate the valence shell of the undiscovered transuranic elements. Using the Thomas–Fermi model, she predicted that they would form a new series similar to the rare earth elements. This proved to be correct. In 1941, she was elected a Fellow of the American Physical Society.

=== Manhattan Project ===
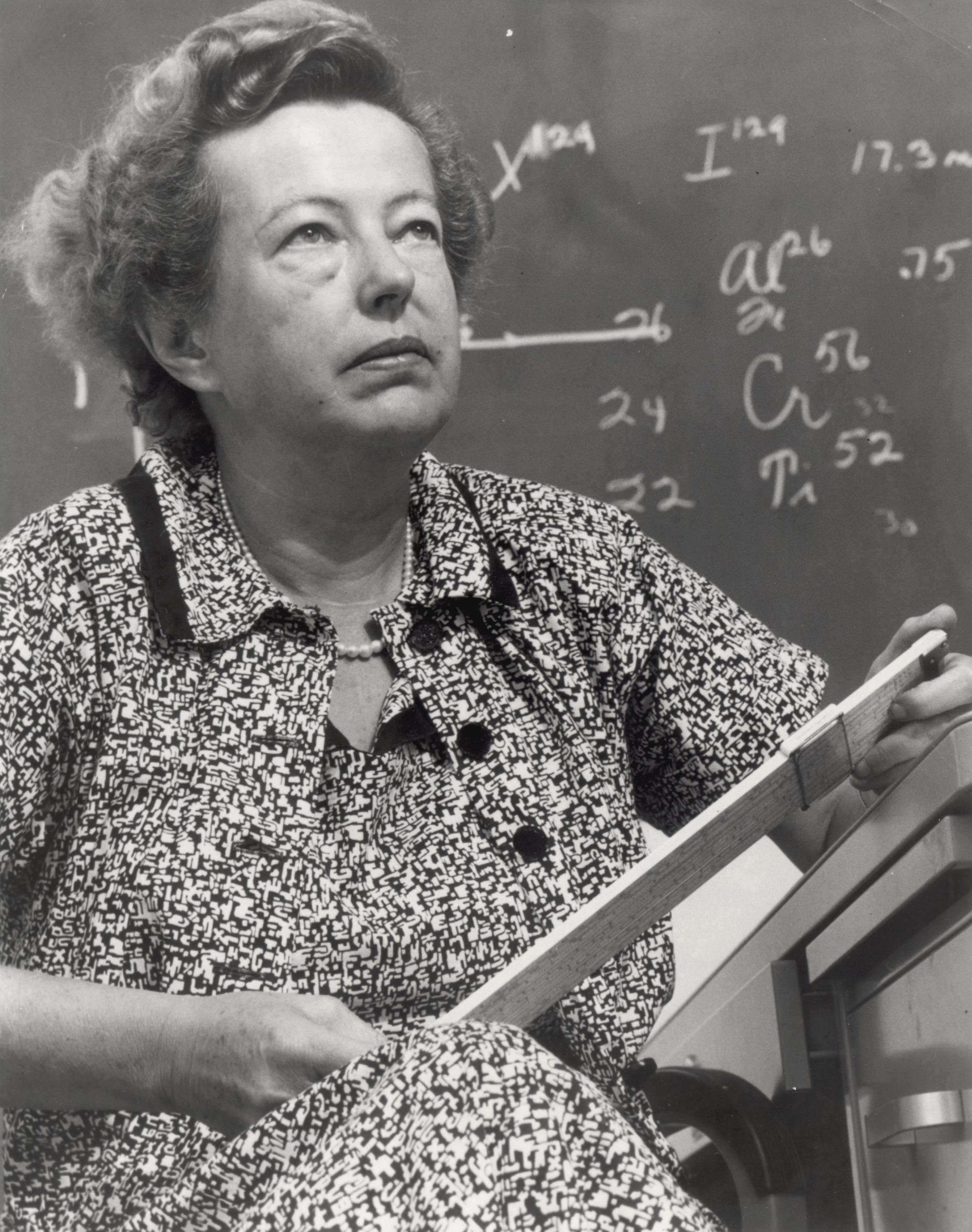
Portrait of Goeppert Mayer

In December 1941, Goeppert Mayer took up her first paid professional position, teaching science part-time at Sarah Lawrence College in New York. In the spring of 1942, with the United States embroiled in World War II, she joined the Manhattan Project. She accepted a part-time research post from Urey with Columbia University's Substitute Alloy Materials (SAM) Laboratories. The objective of this project was to find a means of separating the fissile uranium-235 isotope in natural uranium; she researched the chemical and thermodynamic properties of uranium hexafluoride and investigated the possibility of separating isotopes by photochemical reactions. This method proved impractical at the time, but the development of lasers would later open the possibility of separation of isotopes by laser excitation.

Through her friend Edward Teller, Goeppert Mayer was given a position at Columbia with the Opacity Project, which researched the properties of matter and radiation at extremely high temperatures with an eye to the development of the Teller's "Super" bomb, the wartime program for the development of thermonuclear weapons. In February 1945, Joe was sent to the Pacific War, and she decided to leave her children in New York and join Teller's group at the Los Alamos Laboratory. Joe came back from the Pacific earlier than expected, and they returned to New York together in July 1945.

In February 1946, Joe became a professor in the chemistry department and the new Institute for Nuclear Studies at the University of Chicago, and Goeppert Mayer was able to become a voluntary associate professor of physics at the school. When Teller also accepted a position there, she was able to continue her Opacity work with him. When the nearby Argonne National Laboratory was founded on July 1, 1946, she was also offered a part-time job there as a senior physicist in the theoretical physics division. She responded, "I don't know anything about nuclear physics." She programmed the Aberdeen Proving Ground's ENIAC to solve criticality problems for a liquid metal cooled reactor using the Monte Carlo method. While in Chicago, Mayer derived the Bigeleisen-Mayer equation with Jacob Bigeleisen.

== Nuclear shell model ==
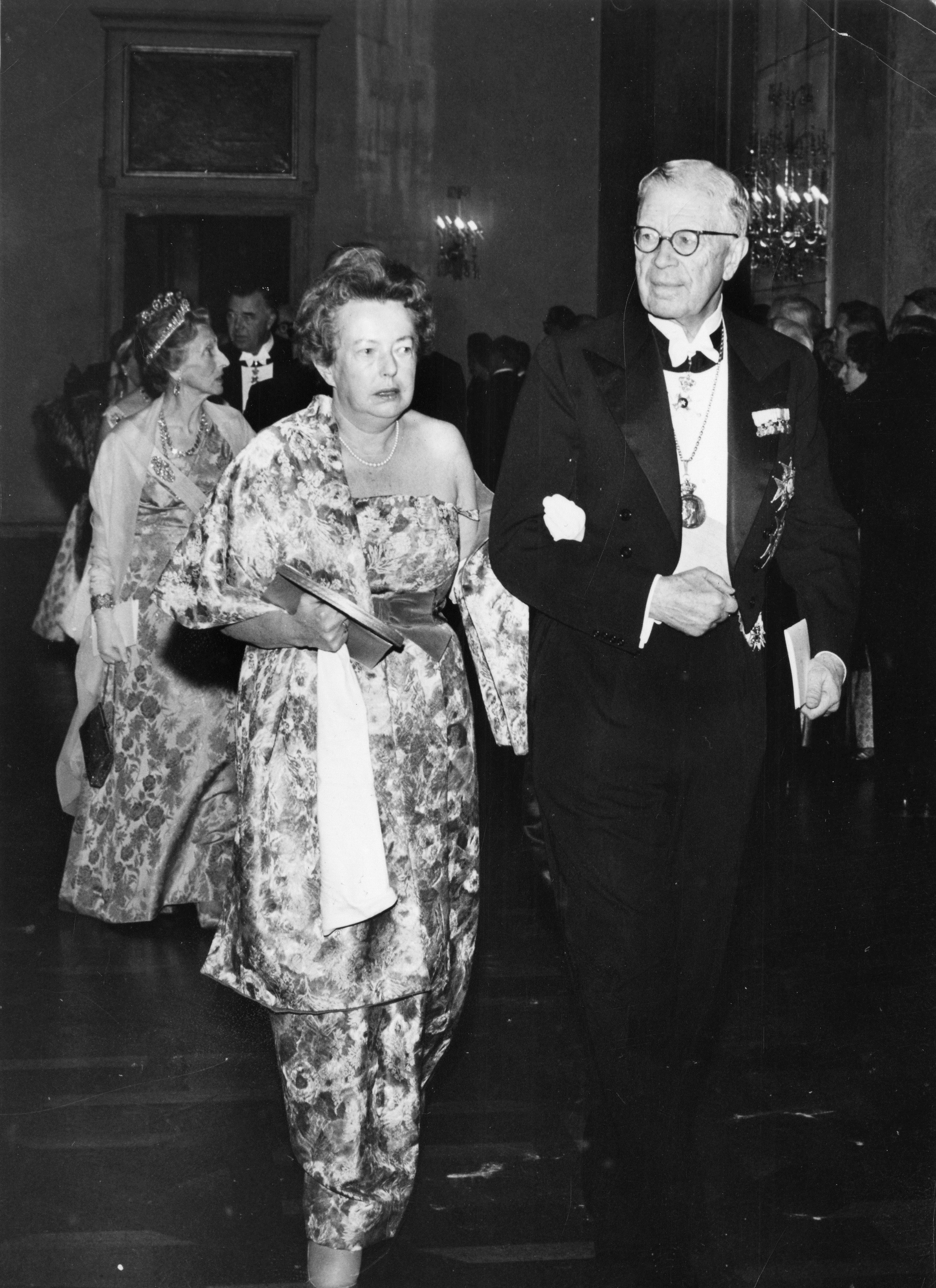
Maria Goeppert-Mayer walking with King Gustaf VI Adolf of Sweden into the a gala banquet following the Nobel ceremony in 1963

During her time at Chicago and Argonne in the late 1940s, Goeppert Mayer developed a mathematical model for the structure of nuclear shells, which she published in 1950. Her model explained why certain numbers of nucleons in an atomic nucleus result in particularly stable configurations. These numbers are what Eugene Wigner called magic numbers: 2, 8, 20, 28, 50, 82, and 126. In an account relayed by Joe Mayer, she attained a critical insight while speaking with Enrico Fermi.

Fermi and Maria were talking in her office when Enrico was called out of the office to answer the telephone on a long distance call. At the door he turned and asked his question about spin-orbit coupling. He returned less than ten minutes later and Maria started to 'snow' him with the detailed explanation. You may remember that Maria, when excited, had a rapid fire oral delivery, whereas Enrico always wanted a slow detailed and methodical explanation. Enrico smiled and left: 'Tomorrow, when you are less excited, you can explain it to me.'

She had realised that the nucleus is a series of closed shells and pairs of neutrons and protons tend to couple together. She described the idea as follows:

Think of a room full of waltzers. Suppose they go round the room in circles, each circle enclosed within another. Then imagine that in each circle, you can fit twice as many dancers by having one pair go clockwise and another pair go counterclockwise. Then add one more variation; all the dancers are spinning twirling round and round like tops as they circle the room, each pair both twirling and circling. But only some of those that go counterclockwise are twirling counterclockwise. The others are twirling clockwise while circling counterclockwise. The same is true of those that are dancing around clockwise: some twirl clockwise, others twirl counterclockwise.

German scientists Otto Haxel, J. Hans D. Jensen, and Hans Suess were also working on solving the same problem, and arrived at the same conclusion independently. While their results were announced in an issue of the Physical Review before Goeppert Mayer in June 1949, her work was received for review in February 1949, while the work of the German authors was received later in April 1949. Afterwards, she collaborated with them. Jensen co-authored a book with her in 1950 titled Elementary Theory of Nuclear Shell Structure. In 1963, Goeppert Mayer and Jensen shared one half of the Nobel Prize in Physics "for their discoveries concerning nuclear shell structure." The other half of that year's Nobel Prize in Physics was awarded to Eugene Wigner. She was the second female Nobel laureate in physics, after Marie Curie, and would be the last for over half a century, until Donna Strickland was awarded the prize in 2018.

== Later life ==
In 1960, Goeppert Mayer was appointed Full Professor of Physics at the University of California, San Diego. Although she suffered from a stroke shortly after arriving there, she continued to teach and conduct research for a number of years. She died of a heart attack on February 20, 1972, in San Diego at the age of 65. She is buried at El Camino Memorial Park in San Diego.

== Recognition ==
=== Memberships ===
Year	Organization	Type	Ref.
1956	National Academy of Sciences	Member	
1964	American Philosophical Society	Member	
1965	American Academy of Arts and Sciences	Member	

=== Awards ===
Year	Organization	Award	Citation	Ref.
1963	Royal Swedish Academy of Sciences	Nobel Prize in Physics	"For their [Goeppert Mayer and J. Hans D. Jensen] discoveries concerning nuclear shell structure."	
1965	American Academy of Achievement	Golden Plate Award	—	

== Commemoration ==
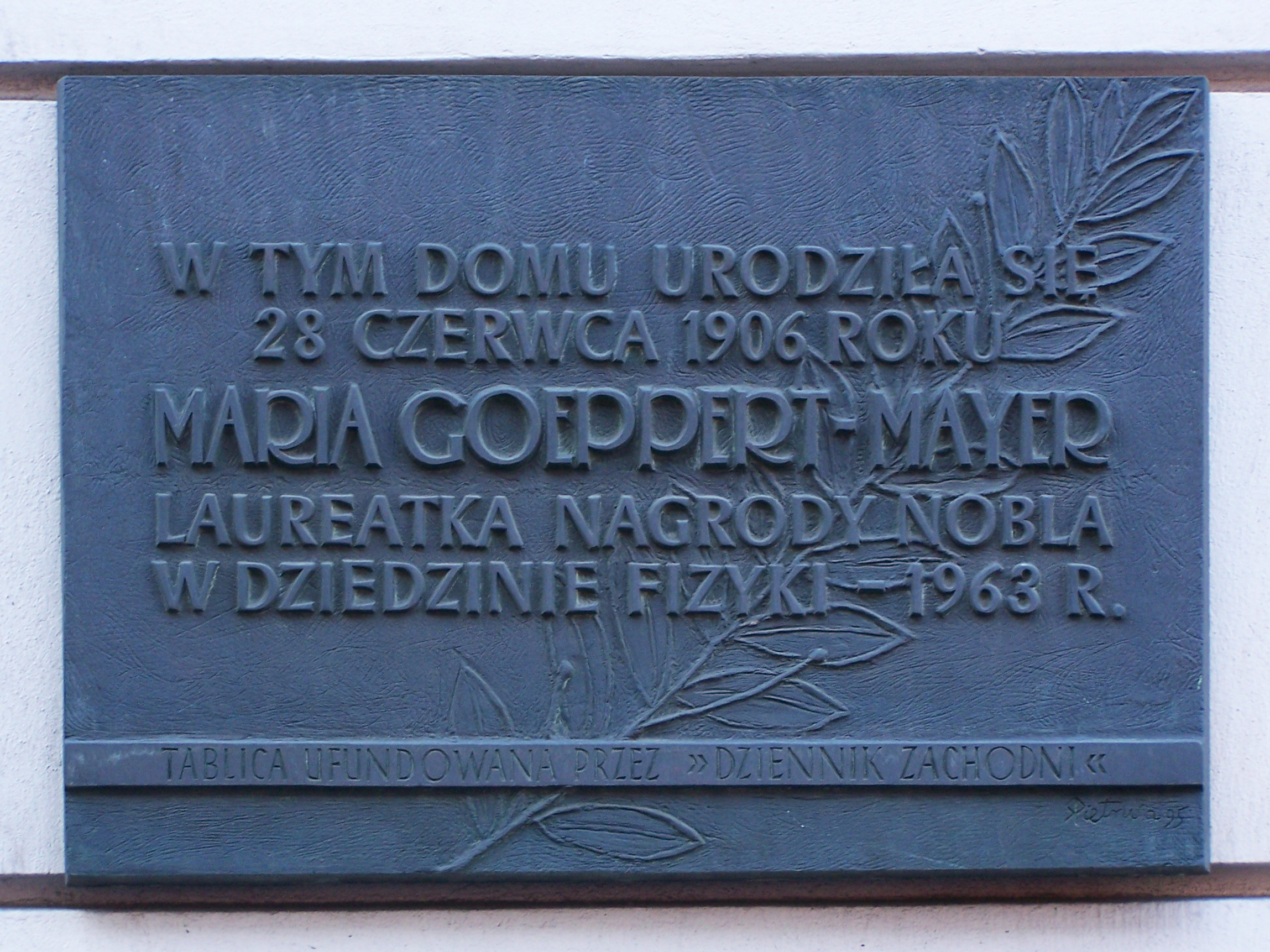

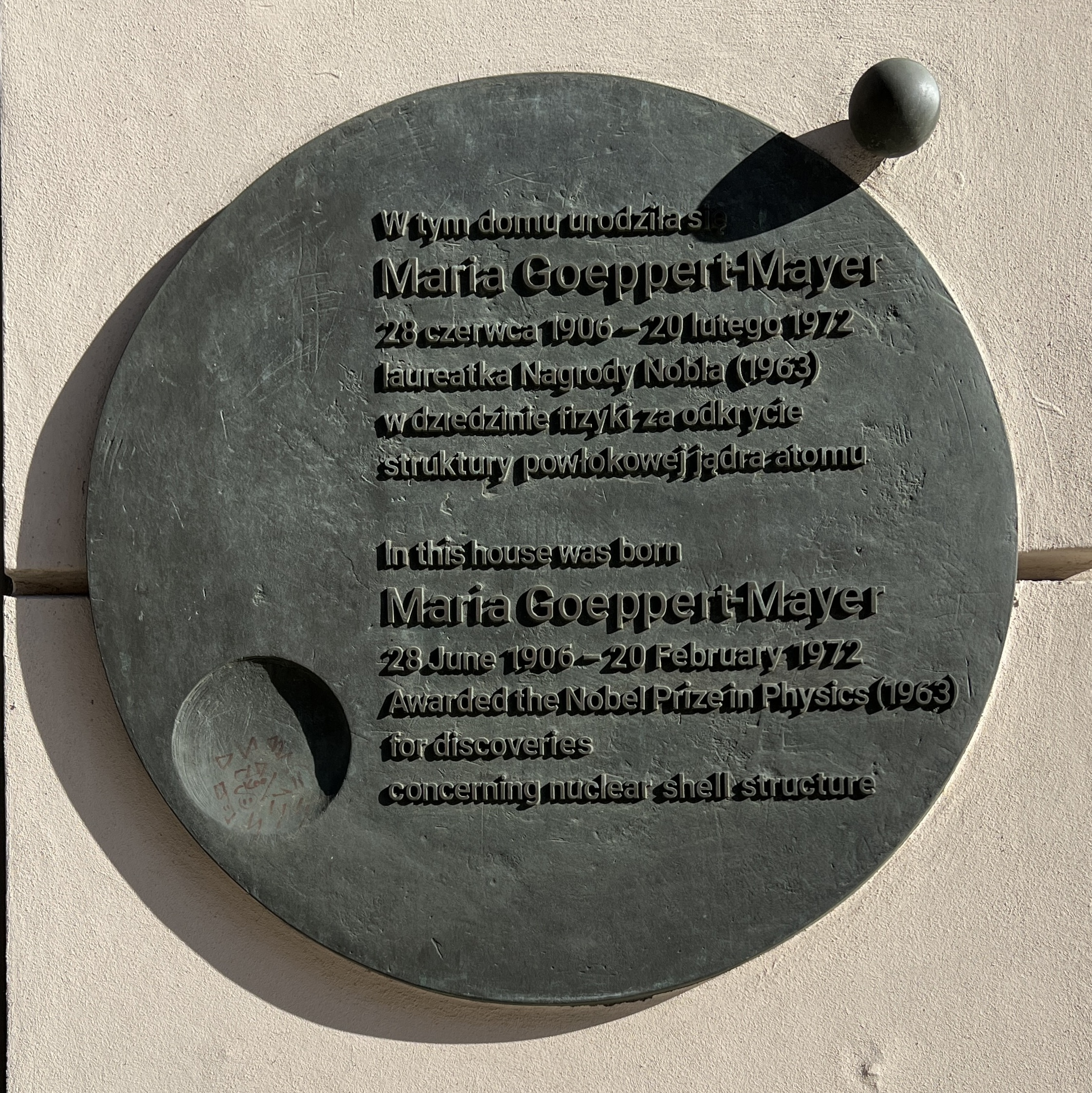
Commemorative plaques for Maria Goeppert Mayer in Katowice, Poland

After her death, the Maria Goeppert-Mayer Award was created by the American Physical Society (APS) to honor young female physicists at the beginning of their careers. Open to all female physicists who hold PhDs, the winner receives money and the opportunity to give guest lectures about her research at four major institutions. In December 2018, the APS named Argonne National Laboratory an APS Historic Site in recognition of her work. Argonne National Laboratory also honors her by presenting an award each year to an outstanding young woman scientist or engineer, while the University of California, San Diego hosts an annual Maria Goeppert-Mayer symposium, bringing together female researchers to discuss current science. In 1996, she was inducted into the National Women's Hall of Fame. In 2011, she was included in the third issuance of the American Scientists collection of US postage stamps, along with Melvin Calvin, Asa Gray, and Severo Ochoa. Her papers are in Geisel Library at the University of California, San Diego, and the university's physics department is housed in Mayer Hall, which is named after her and her husband. Goeppert-Mayer crater on Venus, which has a diameter of about 35 km, is also named after her.

== See also ==
- List of female Nobel laureates
- Timeline of women in science
- Women in physics
