= Rotational partition function =

Function in Chemistry

In chemistry, the rotational partition function relates the rotational degrees of freedom to the rotational part of the energy.

== Definition ==
The total canonical partition function $Z$ of a system of $N$ identical, indistinguishable, noninteracting atoms or molecules can be divided into the atomic or molecular partition functions $\zeta$: $Z = \frac{ \zeta^N }{ N! }$ with: $\zeta = \sum_j g_j e^{ -E_j / k_\text{B} T} ,$ where $g_j$ is the degeneracy of the jth quantum level of an individual particle, $k_\text{B}$ is the Boltzmann constant, and $T$ is the absolute temperature of system. For molecules, under the assumption that total energy levels $E_j$ can be partitioned into its contributions from different degrees of freedom (weakly coupled degrees of freedom) $E_j = \sum_i E_j^i = E_j^\text{trans} + E_j^\text{ns} + E_j^\text{rot} + E_j^\text{vib} + E_j^\text{e}$ and the number of degenerate states are given as products of the single contributions $g_j = \prod_i g_j^i = g_j^\text{trans} g_j^\text{ns} g_j^\text{rot} g_j^\text{vib} g_j^\text{e},$ where "trans", "ns", "rot", "vib" and "e" denotes translational, nuclear spin, rotational and vibrational contributions as well as electron excitation, the molecular partition functions $\zeta = \sum_j g_j e^{-E_j/k_\text{B} T}$ can be written as a product itself $\zeta = \prod_i \zeta^i = \zeta^\text{trans} \zeta^\text{ns} \zeta^\text{rot} \zeta^\text{vib}\zeta^\text{e}.$

== Linear molecules ==
Rotational energies are quantized. For a diatomic molecule like CO or HCl, or a linear polyatomic molecule like OCS in its ground vibrational state, the allowed rotational energies in the rigid rotor approximation are $E_J^\text{rot} = \frac{\mathbf{J}^2}{2I} = \frac{J(J+1)\hbar^2}{2I} = J(J+1)B.$ J is the quantum number for total rotational angular momentum and takes all integer values starting at zero, i.e., $J = 0,1,2, \ldots$, $B = \frac{\hbar^2}{2I}$ is the rotational constant, and $I$ is the moment of inertia. Here we are using B in energy units. If it is expressed in frequency units, replace B by hB in all the expression that follow, where h is the Planck constant. If B is given in units of $\mathrm{cm^{-1}}$, then replace B by hcB where c is the speed of light in vacuum.

For each value of J, we have rotational degeneracy, $g_j$ = (2J+1), so the rotational partition function is therefore $\zeta^\text{rot} = \sum_{J=0}^\infty g_j e^{-E_J/k_\text{B} T} = \sum_{J=0}^\infty (2J+1) e^{-J(J+1) B / k_\text{B} T}.$

For all but the lightest molecules or the very lowest temperatures we have $B \ll k_\text{B} T$. This suggests we can approximate the sum by replacing the sum over J by an integral of J treated as a continuous variable. $\zeta^\text{rot} \approx \int_0^{\infty} (2J+1)e^{-J(J+1) B /k_\text{B} T} dJ = \frac{ k_\text{B} T}{B} .$

This approximation is known as the high temperature limit. It is also called the classical approximation as this is the result for the canonical partition function for a classical rigid rod.

Using the Euler–Maclaurin formula an improved estimate can be found $\zeta^\text{rot} = \frac{ k_\text{B} T}{B} + \frac{1}{3} + \frac{1}{15} \left( \frac{B}{ k_\text{B} T} \right) + \frac{4}{315} \left( \frac{B}{k_\text{B} T} \right)^2 + \frac{1}{315} \left( \frac{B}{k_\text{B} T} \right)^3 + \cdots .$

For the CO molecule at $T = \mathrm{300~K}$, the (unit less) contribution $\zeta^\text{rot}$ to $\zeta$ turns out to be in the range of $10^2$.

The mean thermal rotational energy per molecule can now be computed by taking the derivative of $\zeta^\text{rot}$ with respect to temperature $T$. In the high temperature limit approximation, the mean thermal rotational energy of a linear rigid rotor is $k_\text{B} T$.

== Quantum symmetry effects ==
For a diatomic molecule with a center of symmetry, such as $\rm H_2, N_2, CO_2,$ or $\mathrm{ H_2 C_2}$ (i.e. $D_{\infty h}$ point group), rotation of a molecule by $\pi$ radian about an axis perpendicular to the molecule axis and going through the center of mass will interchange pairs of equivalent atoms. The spin–statistics theorem of quantum mechanics requires that the total molecular wavefunction be either symmetric or antisymmetric with respect to this rotation depending upon whether an even or odd number of pairs of fermion nuclear pairs are exchanged. A given electronic & vibrational wavefunction will either be symmetric or antisymmetric with respect to this rotation. The rotational wavefunction with quantum number J will have a sign change of $(-1)^J$. The nuclear spins states can be separated into those that are symmetric or antisymmetric with respect to the nuclear permutations produced by the rotation. For the case of a symmetric diatomic with nuclear spin quantum number I for each nucleus, there are $(I+1)(2I+1)$ symmetric spin functions and $I (2I+1)$ are antisymmetric functions for a total number of nuclear functions $g^\text{ns} = (2 I + 1)^2$. Nuclei with an even nuclear mass number are bosons and have integer nuclear spin quantum number, I. Nuclei with odd mass number are fermions and had half integer I. For the case of H_{2}, rotation exchanges a single pair of fermions and so the overall wavefunction must be antisymmetric under the half rotation. The vibration-electronic function is symmetric and so the rotation-vibration-electronic will be even or odd depending upon whether J is an even or odd integer. Since the total wavefunction must be odd, the even J levels can only use the antisymmetric functions (only one for I = 1/2) while the odd J levels can use the symmetric functions ( three for I = 1/2). For D2, I = 1 and thus there are six symmetric functions, which go with the even J levels to produce an overall symmetric wavefunction, and three antisymmetric functions that must go with odd J rotational levels to produce an overall even function. The number of nuclear spin functions that are compatible with a given rotation-vibration-electronic state is called the nuclear spin statistical weight of the level, often represented as $g_J$. Averaging over both even and odd J levels, the mean statistical weight is $(1/2) ( 2I+1)^2$, which is one half the value of $g^\text{ns}$ expected ignoring the quantum statistical restrictions. In the high temperature limit, it is traditional to correct for the missing nuclear spin states by dividing the rotational partition function by a factor $\sigma = 2$ with $\sigma$ known as the rotational symmetry number which is 2 for linear molecules with a center of symmetry and 1 for linear molecules without.

== Nonlinear molecules ==
A rigid, nonlinear molecule has rotational energy levels determined by three rotational constants, conventionally written $A, B,$ and $C$, which can often be determined by rotational spectroscopy. In terms of these constants, the rotational partition function can be written in the high temperature limit as $\zeta^\text{rot} \approx \frac{\sqrt{\pi} }{\sigma} \sqrt{ \frac{ (k_\text{B} T)^3 }{ A B C }}$ with $\sigma$ again known as the rotational symmetry number which in general equals the number ways a molecule can be rotated to overlap itself in an indistinguishable way, i.e. that at most interchanges identical atoms. Like in the case of the diatomic treated explicitly above, this factor corrects for the fact that only a fraction of the nuclear spin functions can be used for any given molecular level to construct wavefunctions that overall obey the required exchange symmetries. Another convenient expression for the rotational partition function for symmetric and asymmetric tops is provided by Gordy and Cook: $\zeta^\text{rot} \approx \frac{5.34 \times 10^6}{\sigma} \sqrt{ \frac{T^3}{A B C}}$ where the prefactor comes from $\sqrt{\frac{(\pi k_\text{B}) ^3}{h^3}} = 5.34 \times 10^6$ when A, B, and C are expressed in units of MHz.

The expressions for $\zeta^\text{rot}$ works for asymmetric, symmetric and spherical top rotors.

== See also ==
- Translational partition function
- Vibrational partition function
- Partition function (mathematics)
