= Vibrational partition function =

The vibrational partition function traditionally refers to the component of the canonical partition function resulting from the vibrational degrees of freedom of a system. The vibrational partition function is only well-defined in model systems where the vibrational motion is relatively uncoupled with the system's other degrees of freedom.

== Definition ==
For a system (such as a molecule or solid) with uncoupled vibrational modes the vibrational partition function is defined by $Q_\text{vib}(T) = \prod_j{\sum_n{e^{-\frac{E_{j,n}}{k_\text{B} T}}}}$ where $T$ is the absolute temperature of the system, $k_B$ is the Boltzmann constant, and $E_{j,n}$ is the energy of the jth mode when it has vibrational quantum number $n = 0, 1, 2, \ldots$. For an isolated molecule of N atoms, the number of vibrational modes (i.e. values of j) is 3N − 5 for linear molecules and 3N − 6 for non-linear ones. In crystals, the vibrational normal modes are commonly known as phonons.

== Approximations ==
=== Quantum harmonic oscillator ===
The most common approximation to the vibrational partition function uses a model in which the vibrational eigenmodes or normal modes of the system are considered to be a set of uncoupled quantum harmonic oscillators. It is a first order approximation to the partition function which allows one to calculate the contribution of the vibrational degrees of freedom of molecules towards its thermodynamic variables. A quantum harmonic oscillator has an energy spectrum characterized by: $E_{j,n} = \hbar\omega_j\left(n_j + \frac{1}{2}\right)$ where j runs over vibrational modes and $n_j$ is the vibrational quantum number in the jth mode, $\hbar$ is the Planck constant, h, divided by $2 \pi$ and $\omega_j$ is the angular frequency of the jth mode. Using this approximation we can derive a closed form expression for the vibrational partition function. $Q_\text{vib}(T) =\prod_j{\sum_n{e^{-\frac{E_{j,n}}{k_\text{B} T}}}} = \prod_j e^{-\frac{\hbar \omega_j}{2 k_\text{B} T}} \sum_n \left( e^{-\frac{\hbar \omega_j}{k_\text{B} T}} \right)^n = \prod_j \frac{e^{-\frac{\hbar \omega_j}{2 k_\text{B} T}}}{ 1 - e^{-\frac{\hbar \omega_j}{k_\text{B} T}} } = e^{- \frac{E_\text{ZP}}{k_\text{B} T}} \prod_j \frac{1}{ 1 - e^{-\frac{\hbar \omega_j}{k_\text{B} T}} }$ where $E_\text{ZP} = \frac{1}{2} \sum_j \hbar \omega_j$ is total vibrational zero point energy of the system.

Often the wavenumber, $\tilde{\nu}$ with units of cm^{−1} is given instead of the angular frequency of a vibrational mode and also often misnamed frequency. One can convert to angular frequency by using $\omega = 2 \pi c \tilde{\nu}$ where c is the speed of light in vacuum. In terms of the vibrational wavenumbers we can write the partition function as $Q_\text{vib}(T) = e^{- \frac{E_\text{ZP}}{k_\text{B} T}} \prod_j \frac{1}{ 1 - e^{-\frac{ h c \tilde{\nu}_j}{k_\text{B} T}} }$

It is convenient to define a characteristic vibrational temperature $\Theta_{i,\text{vib}} = \frac{h \nu_i}{k_\text{B}}$ where $\nu$ is experimentally determined for each vibrational mode by taking a spectrum or by calculation. By taking the zero point energy as the reference point to which other energies are measured, the expression for the partition function becomes $Q_\text{vib}(T) = \prod_{i=1}^f \frac{1}{1-e^{-\Theta_{\text{vib},i}/T}}$

== See also ==
- Partition function (mathematics)
