= Aldose reductase =

Enzyme

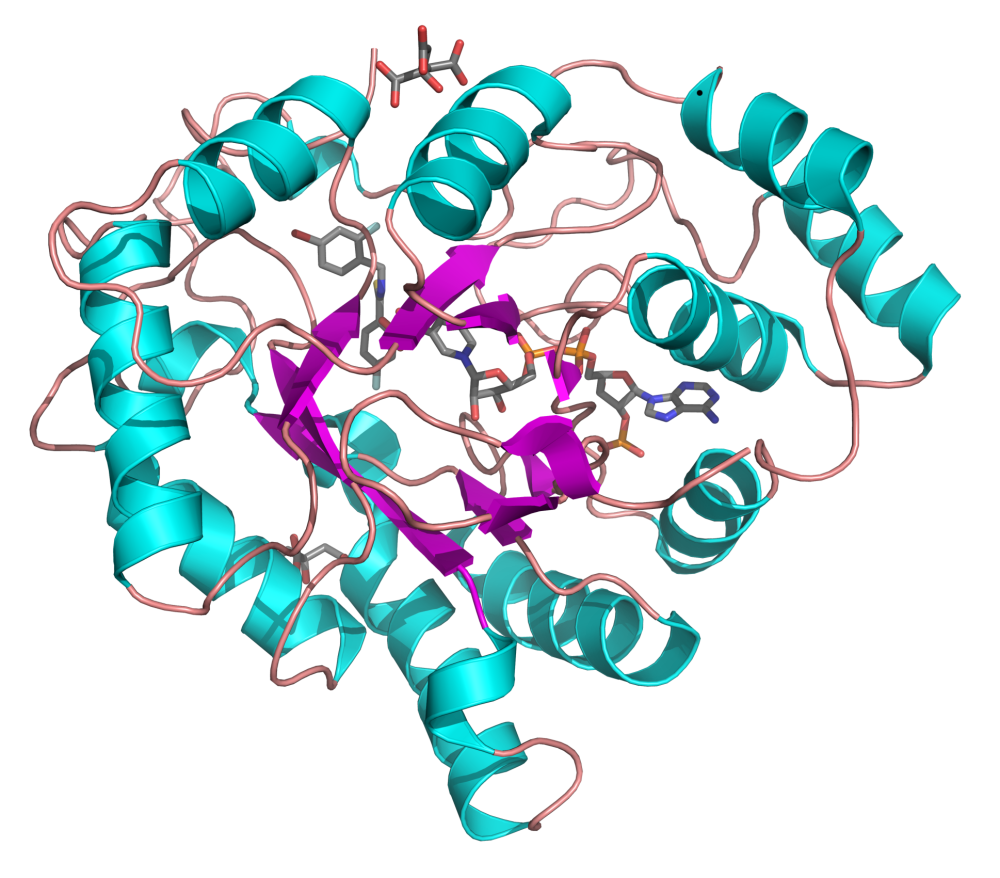
- Ribbon diagram of human aldose reductase in complex with NADP^{+}, citrate, and IDD594, a small molecule inhibitor. From PDB: 1us0.

Identifiers
- EC no.: 1.1.1.21
- CAS no.: 9028-31-3

Databases
- BRENDA: enzyme data
- ExPASy: NiceZyme view
- KEGG: enzyme entry
- MetaCyc: metabolic pathway
- Rhea: reactions
- PDB structures: RCSB PDB PDBe PDBsum
Search
- PMC: articles
- PubMed: articles
- NCBI: proteins

In enzymology, aldose reductase (or aldehyde reductase) (EC 1.1.1.21) is an enzyme that in humans is encoded by the gene AKR1B1. In addition to animals, it has also found in plants, fungi, and slime molds. It is an cytosolic NADPH-dependent oxidoreductase that catalyzes the reduction of a variety of aldehydes and carbonyls, including monosaccharides, and primarily known for catalyzing the reduction of glucose to sorbitol, the first step in polyol pathway of glucose metabolism.

== Reactions ==
Aldose reductase catalyzes the NADPH-dependent conversion of glucose to sorbitol, the first step in polyol pathway of glucose metabolism. The second and last step in the pathway is catalyzed by sorbitol dehydrogenase, which catalyzes the NAD-linked oxidation of sorbitol to fructose. Thus, the polyol pathway results in conversion of glucose to fructose with stoichiometric utilization of NADPH and production of NADH.

glucose
+ NADPH
H^{+}
H^{+}
sorbitol
+ NADP^{+}

Galactose is also a substrate for the polyol pathway, but the corresponding keto sugar is not produced because sorbitol dehydrogenase is incapable of oxidizing galactitol. Nevertheless, aldose reductase can catalyze the reduction of galactose to galactitol.

galactose
+ NADPH
H^{+}
H^{+}
galactitol
+ NADP^{+}

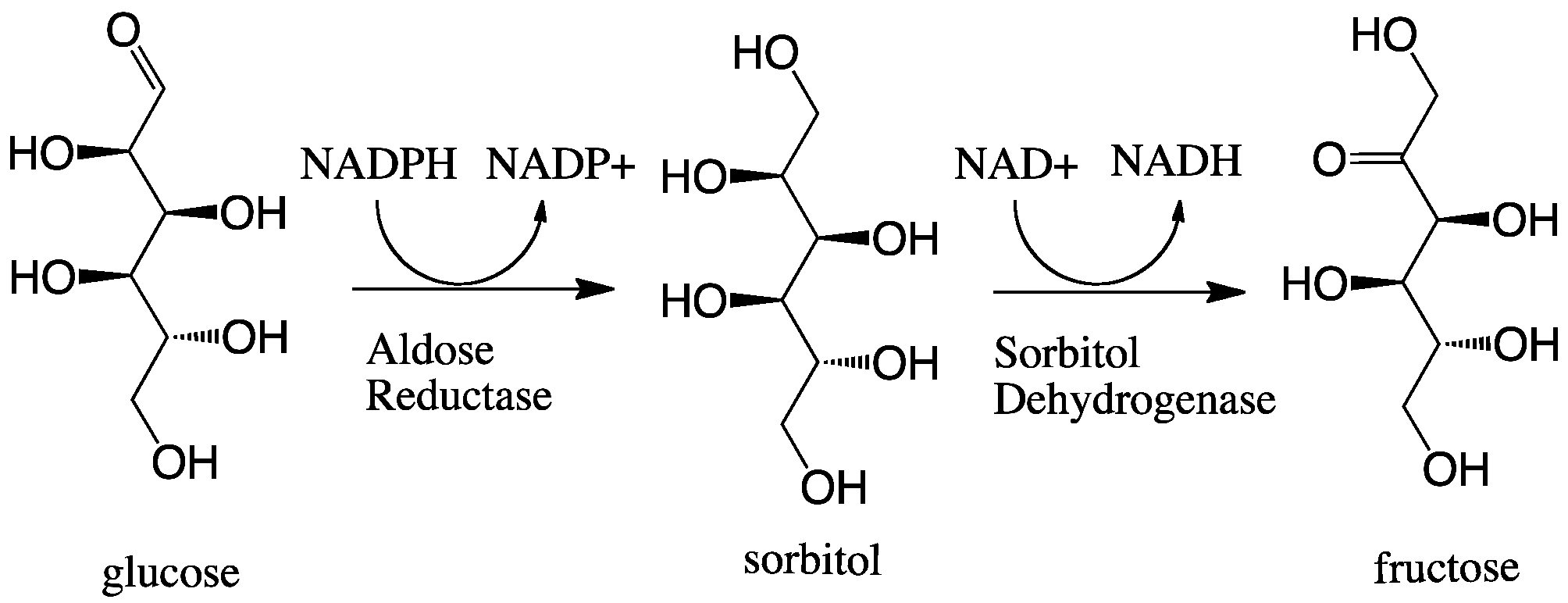
Polyol pathway scheme depicting both the NADPH-dependent reduction step catalyzed by aldose reductase and the NAD^{+}-induced oxidation catalyzed by sorbitol dehydrogenase

== Function ==
The aldose reductase reaction, in particular the sorbitol produced, is important for the function of various organs in the body. For example, it is generally used as the first step in a synthesis of fructose from glucose; the second step is the oxidation of sorbitol to fructose catalyzed by sorbitol dehydrogenase. The main pathway from glucose to fructose (glycolysis) involves phosphorylation of glucose by hexokinase to form glucose 6-phosphate, followed by isomerization to fructose 6-phosphate and hydrolysis of the phosphate, but the sorbitol pathway is useful because it does not require the input of energy in the form of ATP:

- Seminal vesicles: Fructose produced from sorbitol is used by the sperm cells.
- Liver: Fructose produced from sorbitol can be used as an energy source for glycolysis and glyconeogenesis.

Aldose reductase is also present in the lens, retina, Schwann cells of peripheral nerves, placenta and red blood cells.

In Drosophila, CG6084 encoded a highly conserved protein of human Aldo-keto reductase 1B. dAKR1B in hemocytes, is necessary and sufficient for the increase of plasma sugar alcohols after gut infection. Increased sorbitol subsequently activated Metalloprotease 2, which cleaves PGRP-LC to activate systemic immune response in fat bodies. Thus, aldose reductase provides a critical metabolic checkpoint in the global inflammatory response.

== Enzyme structure ==
Aldose reductase may be considered a prototypical enzyme of the aldo-keto reductase enzyme superfamily. The enzyme comprises 315 amino acid residues and folds into a β/α-barrel structural motif composed of eight parallel β strands. Adjacent strands are connected by eight peripheral α-helical segments running anti-parallel to the β sheet. The catalytic active site situated in the barrel core. The NADPH cofactor is situated at the top of the β/α barrel, with the nicotinamide ring projects down in the center of the barrel and pyrophosphate straddling the barrel lip.

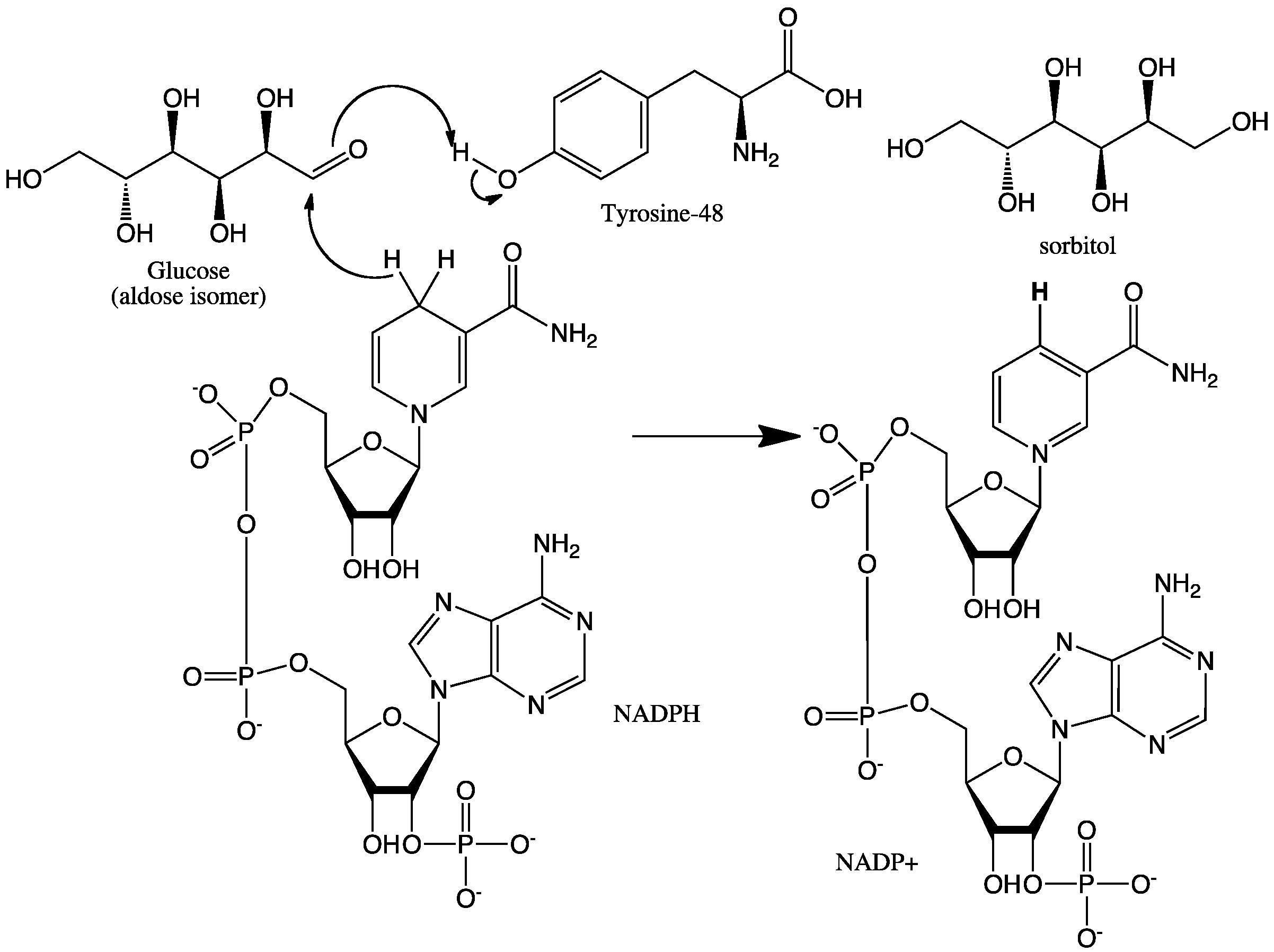
Mechanism of NADPH-dependent conversion of glucose to sorbitol. Note the hydride transfer from NADPH to the carbonyl carbon of the aldose.

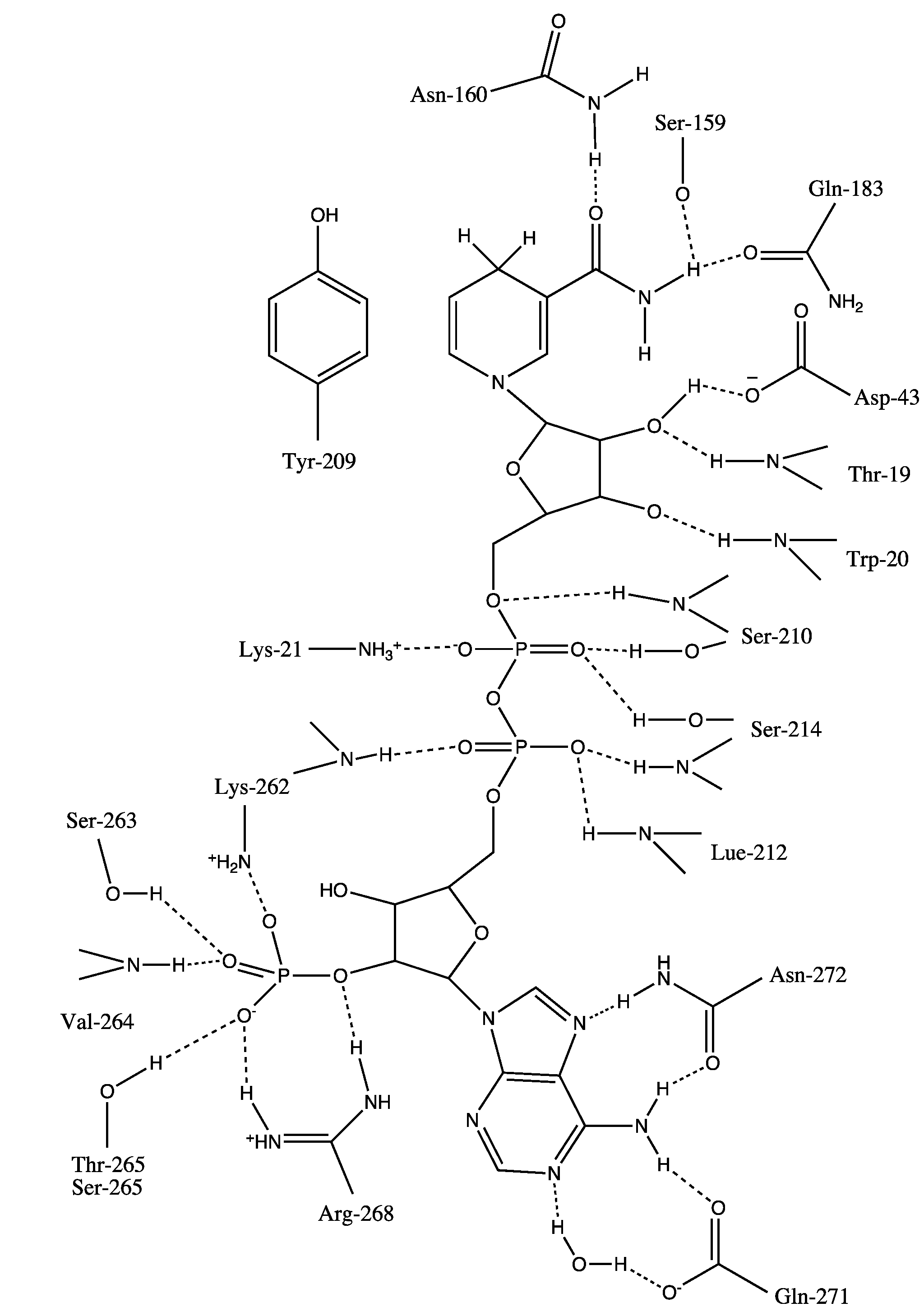
Depiction of NADPH in extended confirmation and hydrogen bonded to the residues physically near the active site of the enzyme.

Role of aldehyde reductase (shown in yellow box) in norepinephrine degradation, contributing in the creation of MHPG, a minor catecholamine metabolite.

Role of aldehyde dehydrogenase (shown in red box) in norepinephrine.

== Enzyme mechanism ==
The reaction mechanism of aldose reductase in the direction of aldehyde reduction follows a sequential ordered path where NADPH binds, followed by the substrate. Binding of NADPH induces a conformational change (Enzyme•NADPH → Enzyme*•NADPH) that involves hinge-like movement of a surface loop (residues 213–217) so as to cover a portion of the NADPH in a manner similar to that of a safety belt. The alcohol product is formed via a transfer of the pro-R hydride of NADPH to the re face of the substrate's carbonyl carbon. Following release of the alcohol product, another conformational change occurs (E*•NADP^{+} → E•NADP^{+}) in order to release NADP^{+}. Kinetic studies have shown that reorientation of this loop to permit release of NADP^{+} appears to represent the rate-limiting step in the direction of aldehyde reduction. As the rate of coenzyme release limits the catalytic rate, it can be seen that perturbation of interactions that stabilize coenzyme binding can have dramatic effects on the maximum velocity (Vmax).

The hydride that is transferred from NADP^{+} to glucose comes from C-4 of the nicotinamide ring at the base of the hydrophobic cavity. Thus, the position of this carbon defines the enzyme's active site. There exist three residues in the enzyme within a suitable distance of the C-4 that could be potential proton donors: Tyr-48, His-110 and Cys-298. Evolutionary, thermodynamic and molecular modeling evidence predicted Tyr-48 as the proton donor. This prediction was confirmed the results of mutagenesis studies. Thus, a [hydrogen-bonding] interaction between the phenolic hydroxyl group of Tyr-48 and the ammonium side chain of Lys-77 is thought to help to facilitate hydride transfer.

== Role in diabetes ==
Diabetes mellitus is recognized as a leading cause of new cases of blindness, and is associated with increased risk for painful neuropathy, heart disease and kidney failure. Many theories have been advanced to explain mechanisms leading to diabetic complications, including stimulation of glucose metabolism by the polyol pathway. Additionally, the enzyme is located in the eye (cornea, retina, lens), kidney, and the myelin sheath–tissues that are often involved in diabetic complications. Under normal glycemic conditions, only a small fraction of glucose is metabolized through the polyol pathway, as the majority is phosphorylated by hexokinase, and the resulting product, glucose-6-phosphate, is utilized as a substrate for glycolysis or pentose phosphate metabolism. However, in response to the chronic hyperglycemia found in diabetics, glucose flux through the polyol pathway is significantly increased. Up to 33% of total glucose utilization in some tissues can be through the polyol pathway. Glucose concentrations are often elevated in diabetics and aldose reductase has long been believed to be responsible for diabetic complications involving a number of organs. Many aldose reductase inhibitors have been developed as drug candidates but virtually all have failed although some such as Epalrestat are commercially available in several countries. Additional reductase inhibitors such as Alrestatin, Exisulind, Imirestat, Zopolrestat, Tolrestat, Zenarestat, Caficrestat, Fidarestat, Govorestat, Ranirestat, Ponalrestat, Risarestat, Sorbinil, and Berberine, Poliumoside, Ganoderic acid are currently in clinical trials.

== See also ==
- AKR1B1
- Aldo-keto reductase
