= Aldose reductase inhibitor =

Class of drugs

Aldose reductase inhibitors are a class of drugs being studied as a way to prevent eye and nerve damage in people with diabetes.

== Mechanism ==
Their target, aldose reductase, is an enzyme that is normally present in many other parts of the body, and catalyzes one of the steps in the sorbitol (polyol) pathway that is responsible for fructose formation from glucose. Aldose reductase activity increases as the glucose concentration rises in diabetes in those tissues that are not insulin sensitive, which include the lenses, peripheral nerves, and glomerulus. Sorbitol does not diffuse through cell membranes easily and therefore accumulates, causing osmotic damage which leads to retinopathy and neuropathy.

== Examples ==
Alrestatin

Epalrestat

Fidarestat

Imirestat

Lidorestat

Minalrestat

Ponalrestat

Ranirestat

Salfredin B_{11}

Sorbinil

Tolrestat

Zenarestat

Zopolrestat

Natural sources reported to inhibit aldose reductase include indian gooseberry, spinach, cumin seeds, fennel seeds, basil leaves, lemon, black pepper, orange, curry leaves, cannabis, cinnamon and lichen. Luteolin, a type of flavonoid found mostly in leaves, and their synthetic derivatives are potential inhibitors of aldose reductase. Other ARIs:

- Risarestat
- Exisulind
- Govorestat: CNS-penetrant ARI
- Caficrestat: AT001
- AT003

== Diabetic cataract ==
Diabetic cataract formation follows an increase in sugars in the lens. The excess sugar within the lens is reduced by aldose reductase to its alcohol, but the lens capsule is relatively impermeable to sugar alcohols. Because of the excess sugar alcohol (polyol), the lens imbibes water, causing osmotic imbalance. Eventually, increased sodium and decreased potassium levels and decreased glutathione levels lead to cataract formation. Topical administration of aldose reductase inhibitors have been shown to prevent the cataract in rats.

== Asthma and COPD ==
This class of drugs is also under investigation as a possible root pathology modulating treatment for asthma and COPD since it has been shown that they inhibit goblet cell metaplasia in the respiratory epithelium, thereby reducing the copious mucous secretion associated with these.
