= PTS Fructose-Mannitol Family =

Family of transport proteins

The PTS Fructose-Mannitol (Fru) Family (TC# 4.A.2) is a large and complex family that is part of the PTS-GFL superfamily. It includes several sequenced fructose, mannose and mannitol-specific porters, as well as several putative PTS porters of unknown specificities. The fructose porters of this family phosphorylate fructose on the 1-position. Those of TC family 4.A.6 phosphorylate fructose on the 6-position.

== Structure ==
The IIA, IIB and IIC domains of the fructose- and mannitol-specific porters are demonstrably homologous. The IIB and IIC domains of the fructose porters appear to be dissimilar from each other as those of the mannitol porters. The IIB and IIC domains of these porters are homologous to those of the Glc family. However, the structure of the IIA domain of the mannitol porter of Escherichia coli has been determined, and it proved to possess an α_{2}β_{2}α_{3} secondary structure, a structure which is very different from the β-sandwich structure of IIA^{Glc}. Further, the IIC domains of the mannitol and fructose porters are as dissimilar from each other as they are from the glucose or lactose families. As is true of other members of the PTS-GFL superfamily, the IIC domains of these permeases probably have a uniform 10 TMS topology.
