= PTS Glucitol Family =

The PTS Glucitol (Gut) Family (TC# 4.A.4)consists only of glucitol-specific porters, but these occur both in Gram-negative and Gram-positive bacteria. It is part of the PTS-GFL superfamily.

== Structure ==
II^{Gut} of Escherichia coli consists of three proteins, a IIA protein, a putative 4 TMS IIC2 protein and a putative 4 TMS IIC1 protein. The N- and C-termini as well as the IIB domain may thereby be localized to the cell cytoplasm, but the topology has not been established experimentally. IIA^{Gut} is believed to be phosphorylated on a histidyl residue, while IIB^{Gut} is probably phosphorylated on a cysteyl residue. However, these possibilities have not been demonstrated experimentally.
