= PTS glucose-glucoside (Glc) family =

The PTS Glucose-Glucoside (Glc) family (TC# 4.A.1) includes porters specific for glucose, glucosamine, N-acetylglucosamine and a large variety of α- and β-glucosides, and is part of the PTS-GFL superfamily.

== Homology ==
Not all β-glucoside PTS porters are in this class, as the PTS porter first described as the cellobiose β-glucoside porter is the diacetylchitobiose porter in the Lac family. The IIA, IIB and IIC domains of all of the group translocators listed below are demonstrably homologous. These porters (the IIC domains) show limited sequence similarity with and are homologous to members of the Fru family and less with members of the Lac family. The IIC domains of the glucose and glucoside subfamilies are as distant from each other as they are from the Fru, Mtl and Lac families. As is true of other members of the PTS-GFL superfamily, the IIC domains of these permeases probably have a uniform 10 TMS topology.

== Structure and function ==
The three-dimensional structures of the IIA and IIB domains of the Escherichia coli glucose porter have been elucidated. IIA^{glc} has a complex β-sandwich structure while IIB^{glc} is a split αβ-sandwich with a topology unrelated to the split αβ-sandwich structure of HPr. Some bacteria have many PTS transport systems belonging to different families. For example, the solventogenic Clostridium acetobutylicum ATCC 824 has 13 altogether with 6 in the Glc family, 2 in the Fru family, 2 in the Lac family, 1 in the Gat family and 2 in the Man family.

Several of the PTS porters in the Glc family lack their own IIA domains and instead use the glucose IIA protein (IIA^{glc} or Crr). Most of these porters have the B and C domains linked together in a single polypeptide chain. A cysteyl residue in the IIB domain is phosphorylated by direct phosphoryl transfer from IIA^{glc}(his~P) or one of its homologues. Those porters which lack a IIA domain include the maltose, arbutin-salicin-cellobiose, trehalose, putative glucoside and sucrose porters of E. coli. Most, but not all Scr porters of other bacteria also lack a IIA domain.

BglF consists of a transmembrane domain, which in addition to TMSs, contains a large cytoplasmic loop. According to Yagur-Kroll et al., this loop, connecting TMS 1 to TMS 2, contains regions that alternate between facing-in and facing-out states and creates the sugar translocation channel. Yagur-Kroll et al. demonstrate spatial proximity between positions at the center of the big loop and the phosphorylation site, suggesting that the two regions come together to execute sugar phosphotransfer.
