= PTS Mannose-Fructose-Sorbose Family =

Family of transport proteins

The PTS Mannose-Fructose-Sorbose (Man) Family (TC# 4.A.6) is a group of multicomponent PTS systems that are involved in sugar uptake in bacteria. This transport process is dependent on several cytoplasmic phosphoryl transfer proteins - Enzyme I (I), HPr, Enzyme IIA (IIA), and Enzyme IIB (IIB) as well as the integral membrane sugar permease complex (IICD). It is not part of the PTS-AG or PTS-GFL superfamilies.

== Distinguishing characteristics from other PTS porters ==
The Man Family is unique in several respects among other PTS porter families:

1. It is the only PTS family in which members possess a IID protein;
2. It is the only PTS family in which the IIB constituent is phosphorylated on a histidyl rather than a cysteyl residue;
3. Its porter members usually exhibit broad specificity for a range of sugars, rather than being specific for just one or a few sugars.

The mannose porter of Escherichia coli, for example, can transport and phosphorylate glucose, mannose, fructose, glucosamine, N-acetylglucosamine, and N-acteylmannosamine.

== Structure ==
The structure of the E. coli IIA^{Man} domain has been shown to exhibit an α/β doubly wound superfold. The IIB domain also exhibits an α/β doubly wound superfold, but it is very dissimilar from that of the IIA domain. Instead, it has the same topology as phosphoglyceromutase (PGM). Since both proteins (IIB^{Man} and PGM) catalyze phosphoryl transfer with a phosphohistidine intermediate, both proteins show a similar distribution of active site residues, and both exhibit similar structures, they are probably homologous.

IIC^{Man} of E. coli has been reported to have six transmembrane α-helical segments, while IID^{Man} was reported to have only one. However, hydropathy plots show multiple peaks of hydropathy, rendering the experimental result, suggesting 1 TMS, questionable. These two proteins together are required for transport, although IIC^{Man} is presumed to comprise all or most of the sugar transporting channel.

== Transport reaction ==
The generalized reaction catalyzed by members of the Man Family is:

Sugar (out) + PEP (in) → Sugar-P (in) + pyruvate (in)
