= High-mannose-oligosaccharide β-1,4-N-acetylglucosaminyltransferase =

Class of enzymes

Identifiers
- EC no.: 2.4.1.197
- CAS no.: 123425-54-7

Databases
- IntEnz: IntEnz view
- BRENDA: BRENDA entry
- ExPASy: NiceZyme view
- KEGG: KEGG entry
- MetaCyc: metabolic pathway
- PRIAM: profile
- PDB structures: RCSB PDB PDBe PDBsum
Search
- PMC: articles
- PubMed: articles
- NCBI: proteins

High-mannose-oligosaccharide β-1,4-N-acetylglucosaminyltransferase (EC 2.4.1.197), uridine diphosphoacetylglucosamine-oligosaccharide acetylglucosaminyltransferase, acetylglucosamine-oligosaccharide acetylglucosaminyltransferase, UDP-GlcNAc:oligosaccharide beta-N-acetylglucosaminyltransferase, UDP-N-acetyl-D-glucosamine:high-mannose-oligosaccharide beta-1,4-N-acetylglucosaminyltransferase) is an enzyme with systematic name UDP-N-acetyl-D-glucosamine:high-mannose-oligosaccharide 4-beta-N-acetylglucosaminyltransferase. This enzyme catalyses the following chemical reaction

Transfers an N-acetyl-D-glucosamine residue from UDP-N-acetyl-D-glucosamine to the 4-position of a mannose linked alpha-(1->6) to the core mannose of high-mannose oligosaccharides produced by Dictyostelium discoideum

The activity of the intersecting mannose residue as acceptor is dependent on two other mannose residues attached by alpha-1,3 and alpha-1,6 links.
