= L-rhamnonate dehydratase =

Identifiers
- EC no.: 4.2.1.90

Databases
- IntEnz: IntEnz view
- BRENDA: BRENDA entry
- ExPASy: NiceZyme view
- KEGG: KEGG entry
- MetaCyc: metabolic pathway
- PRIAM: profile
- PDB structures: RCSB PDB PDBe PDBsum
- Gene Ontology: AmiGO / QuickGO
Search
- PMC: articles
- PubMed: articles
- NCBI: proteins

The enzyme Lrhamnonate dehydratase (EC 4.2.1.90) catalyzes the chemical reaction

L-rhamnonate $\rightleftharpoons$ 2-dehydro-3-deoxy-L-rhamnonate + H_{2}O

This enzyme belongs to the family of lyases, specifically the hydro-lyases, which cleave carbon-oxygen bonds. The systematic name of this enzyme class is L-rhamnonate hydro-lyase (2-dehydro-3-deoxy-L-rhamnonate-forming). This enzyme is also called Lrhamnonate hydro-lyase. This enzyme participates in fructose and mannose metabolism.

== Structural studies ==
As of late 2007, 4 structures have been solved for this class of enzymes, with PDB accession codes 2GSH, 2OZ3, 2P0I, and 2P3Z.
