= Epalrestat =

Names
- Preferred IUPAC name {(5Z)-5-[(2E)-2-Methyl-3-phenylprop-2-en-1-ylidene]-4-oxo-2-sulfanylidene-1,3-thiazolidin-3-yl}acetic acid

Identifiers
| CAS Number | 82159-09-9 |
| 3D model (JSmol) | Interactive image |
| ChEBI | CHEBI:31539 |
| ChEMBL | ChEMBL56337 |
| ChemSpider | 1266086 |
| ECHA InfoCard | 100.200.343 |
| KEGG | D01688 |
| PubChem CID | 1549120 |
| UNII | 424DV0807X |
| CompTox Dashboard (EPA) | DTXSID1046479 |
- InChI: InChI=1S/C15H13NO3S2/c1-10(7-11-5-3-2-4-6-11)8-12-14(19)16(9-13(17)18)15(20)21-12/h2-8H,9H2,1H3,(H,17,18)/b10-7+,12-8- Key: CHNUOJQWGUIOLD-NFZZJPOKSA-N; InChI=1/C15H13NO3S2/c1-10(7-11-5-3-2-4-6-11)8-12-14(19)16(9-13(17)18)15(20)21-12/h2-8H,9H2,1H3,(H,17,18)/b10-7+,12-8- Key: CHNUOJQWGUIOLD-NFZZJPOKBR
- SMILES: O=C(O)CN1C(=O)C(\SC1=S)=C/C(=C/c2ccccc2)C

Properties
| Chemical formula | C_{15}H_{13}NO_{3}S_{2} |
| Molar mass | 319.401 g/mol |
| Density | 1.43 g/cm^{3} |
| Melting point | 210 °C (410 °F; 483 K) |
| Boiling point | 516.8 °C (962.2 °F; 789.9 K) |
- Except where otherwise noted, data are given for materials in their standard state (at 25 °C [77 °F], 100 kPa). verify (what is ?) Infobox references

Epalrestat is a carboxylic acid derivative and a noncompetitive and reversible aldose reductase inhibitor used for the treatment of diabetic neuropathy, which is one of the most common long-term complications in patients with diabetes mellitus. It reduces the accumulation of intracellular sorbitol which is believed to be the cause of diabetic neuropathy, retinopathy and nephropathy It is well tolerated, with the most commonly reported adverse effects being gastrointestinal issues such as nausea and vomiting, as well as increases in certain liver enzymes. Chemically, epalrestat is unusual in that it is a drug that contains a rhodanine group. Aldose reductase is the key enzyme in the polyol pathway whose enhanced activity is the basis of diabetic neuropathy. Aldose reductase inhibitors (ARI) target this enzyme. Out of the many ARIs developed, ranirestat and fidarestat are in the trial stage. Others have been discarded due to unacceptable adverse effects or weak efficacy. Epalrestat is the only ARI commercially available. It is easily absorbed into the neural tissue and inhibits the enzyme with minimum side effects.

== Evidence ==
It has been demonstrated in animal experiments that there is an improvement in sorbitol levels and Na+/K+ ATPase activity leading to improved nerve conduction velocity. Diabetic rats treated with epalrestat showed improvement in morphological abnormalities of nerves. In a placebo controlled double blind trial of 196 patients, it was shown that Epalrestat in a dose of 150 mg/day improved the effects of diabetic neuropathy like upper limb spontaneous pain, motor nerve conduction velocity, thresholds of vibratory sensation and autonomic nerve function as compared to a placebo. These effects were significantly better in those with poorer control of diabetes. A systematic review and metaanalysis showed that based on the results of 10 articles, it can be concluded that Epalrestat has some benefit in the control of diabetic cardiovascular autonomic neuropathy but only in the early or mild cases. It also doesn't influence glycaemic control.

== Brand names ==
- Aldonil (Zydus Medica), India
- Aldorin, Bangladesh
- Alrista (marketed and not manufactured by Macleods), India
- Epalrica-M (Ordain Global), India
- Eparel 50 (Microlabs Ltd), India
- Epimeth (Zaiva Lifesciences), India
- Eplistat 150 SR (Schem), India
- Letostat-SR (Amor Pharmaceuticals), India
- Listap-50 (Vivid Biotek), India
- Tanglin (Yangtze River Pharmaceutical Group), China
