= PTS L-Ascorbate Family =

Enzyme

Phosphotransferase permease

Identifiers
- Symbol: PTS
- Pfam: PF03611
- InterPro: IPR004703
- TCDB: 4.A.7
- OPM superfamily: 426
- OPM protein: 5zov
Available protein structures:
- Pfam: structures / ECOD
- PDB: RCSB PDB; PDBe; PDBj
- PDBsum: structure summary

The PTS L-Ascorbate (L-Asc) Family (TC# 4.A.7) includes porters specific for L-ascorbate, and is part of the PTS-AG superfamily. A single PTS permease of the L-Asc family of PTS permeases has been functionally characterized. This is the SgaTBA system, renamed UlaABC (utilization of L-ascorbate) by Yew and Gerlt.

== The SgaTBA System ==
The SgaTBA permease consists of three proteins: SgaT, SgaB, and SgaA. SgaT is a 12 TMS protein, possibly very distantly related to the MFS hexuronate permease of Escherichia coli (TC# 2.A.1.14.2), which presumably functions as a PTS IIC protein. This gene product, as well as SgaB and SgaA, are all essential for anaerobic L-ascorbate utilization, transport and phosphorylation. This is the first documented example where the two sugar-specific energy-coupling proteins of a PTS permease are more closely related to the proteins of two different families. The sga regulation is controlled by the nearby YjfQ repressor.

== Homology ==
Homologues of SgaT, like other PTS protein homologues, have been identified in a large number of evolutionarily divergent bacteria, but not in archaea or eukaryotes. Bacteria that encode SgaT homologues include numerous Gram-negative Pseudomonadota, as well as many low and high G+C Gram-positive bacteria. Except for species of Corynebacterium, Streptomyces, and Bacillus, almost all organisms possessing SgaTBA homologues are human/animal pathogens.

Several organisms have two or more SgaT paralogues, including E. coli, which has three. In some of the homologues found in other bacteria, SgaB domains are fused C-terminal to the SgaT domains. For example, this is true of putative transporters in Vibrio cholerae, Pasteurella multocida and Mycoplasma pulmonis. Homologues of SgaB and SgaA, but not SgaT, are also found in transcriptional activator proteins where they function in regulation rather than sugar transport.

== Transport Reaction ==
The group translocation reaction catalyzed by SgaTBA is:

L-ascorbate (out) → L-ascorbate-6-phosphate (in)
