= Sorbitol-6-phosphate 2-dehydrogenase =

Enzyme

sorbitol-6-phosphate 2-dehydrogenase

Identifiers
- EC no.: 1.1.1.140
- CAS no.: 37250-69-4

Databases
- IntEnz: IntEnz view
- BRENDA: BRENDA entry
- ExPASy: NiceZyme view
- KEGG: KEGG entry
- MetaCyc: metabolic pathway
- PRIAM: profile
- PDB structures: RCSB PDB PDBe PDBsum
- Gene Ontology: AmiGO / QuickGO
Search
- PMC: articles
- PubMed: articles
- NCBI: proteins

In enzymology, sorbitol-6-phosphate dehydrogenase (EC 1.1.1.140) is an enzyme that catalyzes the chemical reaction

D-sorbitol 6-phosphate
+ NAD^{+}
H^{+}
H^{+}
fructose 6-phosphate
+ NADH

The two substrates of this enzyme are D-sorbitol 6-phosphate and oxidised nicotinamide adenine dinucleotide (NAD^{+}). Its products are fructose 6-phosphate (shown in its open-chain form), reduced NADH, and a proton.

This enzyme belongs to the family of oxidoreductases, specifically those acting on the CH-OH group of donor with NAD^{+} or NADP^{+} as acceptor. The systematic name of this enzyme class is D-sorbitol-6-phosphate:NAD^{+} 2-oxidoreductase. Other names in common use include ketosephosphate reductase, ketosephosphate reductase, D-sorbitol 6-phosphate dehydrogenase, D-sorbitol-6-phosphate dehydrogenase, sorbitol-6-P-dehydrogenase, and D-glucitol-6-phosphate dehydrogenase. This enzyme participates in fructose and mannose metabolism.
