= GDP-6-deoxy-D-talose 4-dehydrogenase =

Identifiers
- EC no.: 1.1.1.135
- CAS no.: 37250-66-1

Databases
- IntEnz: IntEnz view
- BRENDA: BRENDA entry
- ExPASy: NiceZyme view
- KEGG: KEGG entry
- MetaCyc: metabolic pathway
- PRIAM: profile
- PDB structures: RCSB PDB PDBe PDBsum
- Gene Ontology: AmiGO / QuickGO
Search
- PMC: articles
- PubMed: articles
- NCBI: proteins

In enzymology, a GDP-6-deoxy-D-talose 4-dehydrogenase (EC 1.1.1.135) is an enzyme that catalyzes the chemical reaction

GDP-6-deoxy-D-talose + NAD(P)+ $\rightleftharpoons$ GDP-4-dehydro-6-deoxy-D-mannose + NAD(P)H + H^{+}

The 3 substrates of this enzyme are GDP-6-deoxy-D-talose, NAD^{+}, and NADP^{+}, whereas its 4 products are GDP-4-dehydro-6-deoxy-D-mannose, NADH, NADPH, and H^{+}.

This enzyme belongs to the family of oxidoreductases, specifically those acting on the CH-OH group of donor with NAD^{+} or NADP^{+} as acceptor. The systematic name of this enzyme class is GDP-6-deoxy-D-talose:NAD(P)^{+} 4-oxidoreductase. This enzyme is also called guanosine diphospho-6-deoxy-D-talose dehydrogenase. This enzyme participates in fructose and mannose metabolism.
