= Sorbinil =

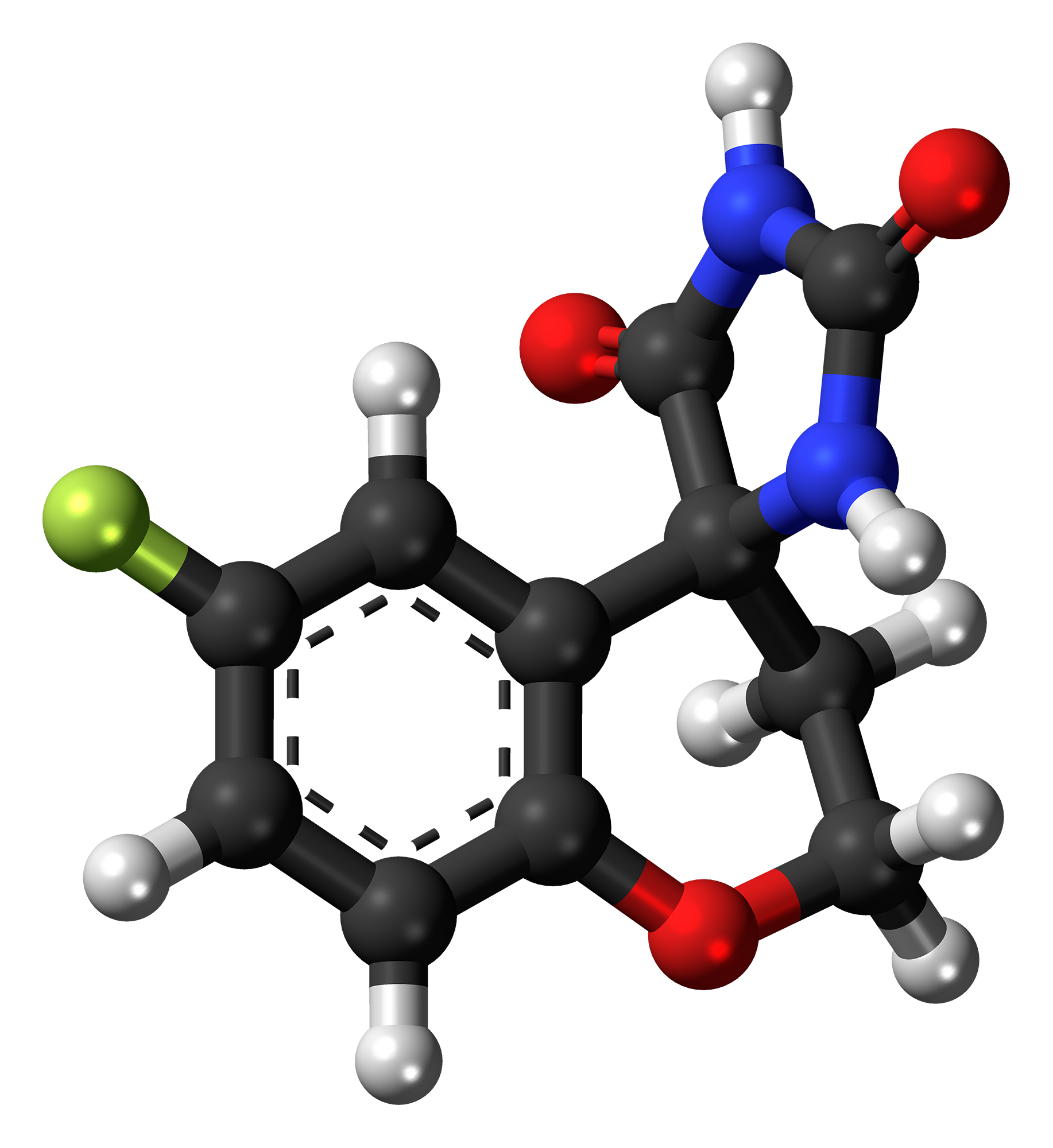

Names
- Preferred IUPAC name (4S)-6-Fluoro-2,3-dihydrospiro[[1]benzopyran-4,4′-imidazolidine]-2,5-dione
- Other names (S)-6-Fluorospiro(chroman-4,4'-imidazolidine)-2',5'-dione; CP 45634

Identifiers
CAS Number	68367-52-2
3D model (JSmol)	Interactive image
ChEMBL	ChEMBL7681
ChemSpider	298991
ECHA InfoCard	100.210.173
IUPHAR/BPS	7415
KEGG	D05893
PubChem CID	337359
UNII	G4186B906P
CompTox Dashboard (EPA)	DTXSID0023587
- InChI: InChI=1S/C11H9FN2O3/c12-6-1-2-8-7(5-6)11(3-4-17-8)9(15)13-10(16)14-11/h1-2,5H,3-4H2,(H2,13,14,15,16)/t11-/m0/s1
- SMILES: Fc3ccc2OCC[C@@]1(C(=O)NC(=O)N1)c2c3

Properties
Chemical formula	C_{11}H_{9}FN_{2}O_{3}
Molar mass	236.202 g·mol^{−1}
Appearance	White to off-white powder
- Except where otherwise noted, data are given for materials in their standard state (at 25 °C [77 °F], 100 kPa). Infobox references

Sorbinil (INN) is an aldose reductase inhibitor being investigated for treatment of diabetic complications including neuropathy and retinopathy. Aldose reductase is an enzyme present in lens and brain that removes excess glucose by converting it to sorbitol. Sorbitol accumulation can lead to the development of cataracts in the lens and neuropathy in peripheral nerves. Sorbinil has been shown to inhibit aldose reductase in human brain and placenta and calf and rat lens. Sorbinil reduced sorbitol accumulation in rat lens and sciatic nerve of diabetic rats orally administered 0.25 mg/kg sorbinil.
