= Phosphoenolpyruvate—protein phosphotransferase =

Enzyme

phosphoenolpyruvate-protein phosphotransferase

Identifiers
- EC no.: 2.7.3.9
- CAS no.: 37278-17-4

Databases
- BRENDA: enzyme data
- ExPASy: NiceZyme view
- KEGG: enzyme entry
- MetaCyc: metabolic pathway
- Rhea: reactions
- PDB structures: RCSB PDB PDBe PDBsum
- Gene Ontology: AmiGO / QuickGO
Search
- PMC: articles
- PubMed: articles
- NCBI: proteins

In enzymology, a phosphoenolpyruvate-protein phosphotransferase (EC 2.7.3.9) is an enzyme that catalyzes the chemical reaction

phosphoenolpyruvate + protein histidine $\rightleftharpoons$ pyruvate + protein Npi-phospho-L-histidine

Thus, the two substrates of this enzyme are phosphoenolpyruvate and protein histidine, whereas its two products are pyruvate and protein Npi-phospho-L-histidine.

This enzyme belongs to the family of transferases, specifically those transferring phosphorus-containing groups (phosphotransferases) with a nitrogenous group as acceptor. This enzyme participates in phosphotransferase system (pts).

== Nomenclature ==
The systematic name of this enzyme class is phosphoenolpyruvate:protein-L-histidine Npi-phosphotransferase. Other names in common use include phosphoenolpyruvate sugar phosphotransferase enzyme I, phosphopyruvate-protein factor phosphotransferase, phosphopyruvate-protein phosphotransferase, sugar-PEP phosphotransferase enzyme I, and phosphoenolpyruvate:protein-L-histidine N-pros-phosphotransferase.
