= Rhodanine =

Names
- Preferred IUPAC name 2-Sulfanylidene-1,3-thiazolidin-4-one
- Other names 2-Thioxo-4-thiazolidinone; 4-Oxo-2-thioxothiazoline

Identifiers
CAS Number	141-84-4
3D model (JSmol)	Interactive image
ChEMBL	ChEMBL224633
ChemSpider	1013337
ECHA InfoCard	100.005.005
EC Number	205-505-1
KEGG	C07280
PubChem CID	1201546
UNII	7O50LKL2G8
CompTox Dashboard (EPA)	DTXSID4026002
- InChI: InChI=1S/C3H3NOS2/c5-2-1-7-3(6)4-2/h1H2,(H,4,5,6) Key: KIWUVOGUEXMXSV-UHFFFAOYSA-N; InChI=1/C3H3NOS2/c5-2-1-7-3(6)4-2/h1H2,(H,4,5,6) Key: KIWUVOGUEXMXSV-UHFFFAOYAP
- SMILES: O=C1NC(=S)SC1

Properties
Chemical formula	C_{3}H_{3}NOS_{2}
Molar mass	133.18 g·mol^{−1}
Density	0.868 g/cm^{−3}
Melting point	170 °C (338 °F; 443 K)
Solubility in water	Soluble
Solubility	Ethanol, dimethyl sulfoxide

Hazards
- GHS labelling
Pictograms	(GHS05: Corrosive) (GHS07: Exclamation mark)
Signal word	Danger
Hazard statements	H302, H318
Precautionary statements	P264, P270, P280, P301+P312, P305+P351+P338, P310, P330, P501
- Except where otherwise noted, data are given for materials in their standard state (at 25 °C [77 °F], 100 kPa). verify (what is ?) Infobox references

Rhodanine is a 5-membered heterocyclic organic compound possessing a thiazolidine core. It was discovered in 1877 by Marceli Nencki who named it "Rhodaninsaure" in reference to its synthesis from ammonium rhodanide (known as ammonium thiocyanate to modern chemists) and chloroacetic acid in water.

Rhodanines can also be prepared by the reaction of carbon disulfide, ammonia, and chloroacetic acid, which proceeds via an intermediate dithiocarbamate.

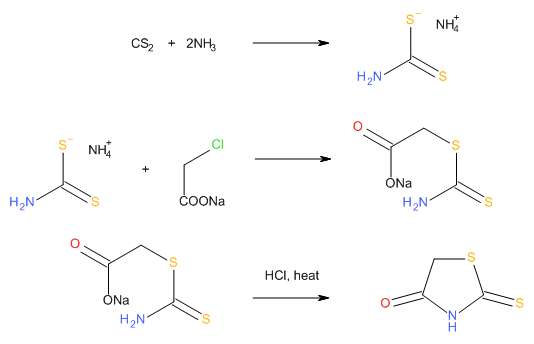

== Derivatives ==
Some rhodanine derivatives have pharmacological properties; for instance, epalrestat is used to treat diabetic neuropathy. However, most are promiscuous binders with off target toxicity; as a result, this class of compounds is viewed with suspicion by medicinal chemists. However, many differing academic opinions exist concerning the correct use of PAINS filters, the necessity of the experimental confirmations of such properties, and of the usefulness of rhodanine derivatives as a whole.
