= AKR1B1 =

Protein-coding gene in the species Homo sapiens

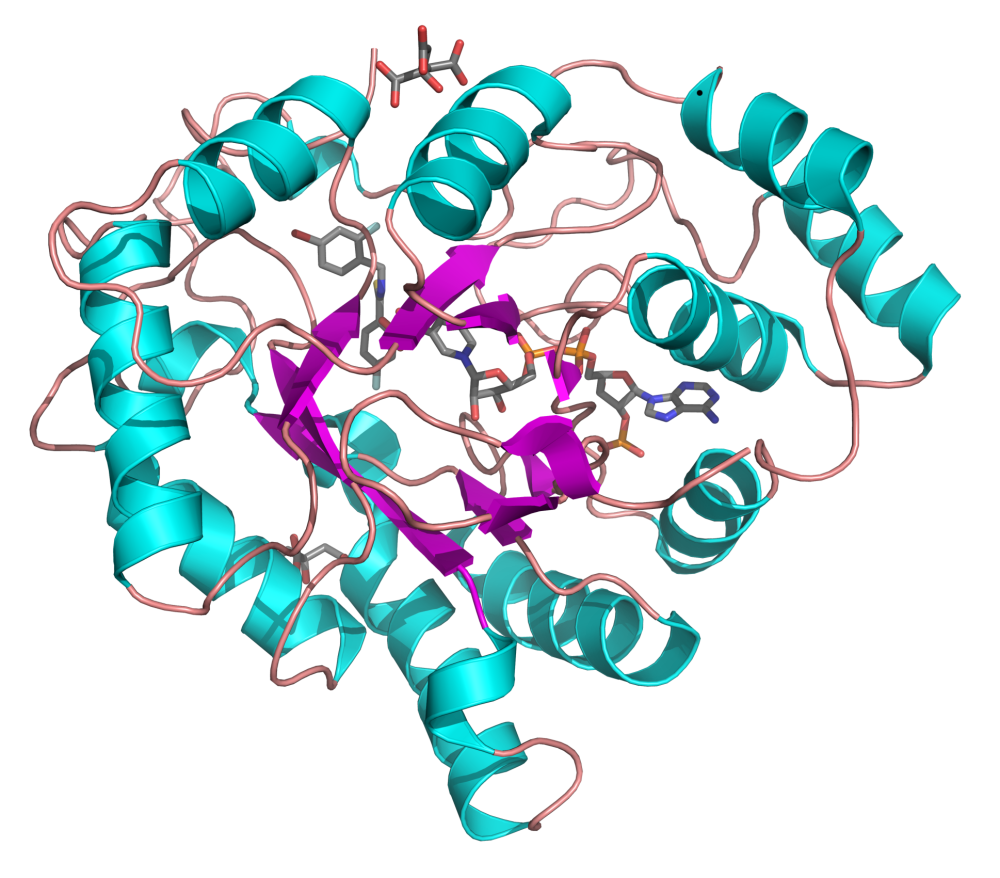

Identifiers
- Aliases: AKR1B1, ADR, ALDR1, ALR2, AR, aldo-keto reductase family 1, member B1 (aldose reductase), aldo-keto reductase family 1 member B
- External IDs: OMIM: 103880; MGI: 1353494; GeneCards: AKR1B1
Available structures
PDB	Ortholog search: PDBe RCSB
PDB	List of PDB id codes 2PDQ, 1IEI, 2ACQ, 2FZB, 2IKH, 2PDH, 3LD5, 2IQ0, 1T40, 2PDG, 2PDB, 3GHR, 2NVD, 2PD5, 2PDU, 3M4H, 4GCA, 2PDX, 2I17, 1US0, 1AZ1, 2R24, 3M64, 1MAR, 3ONC, 1Z3N, 3ONB, 2ACR, 2DUZ, 2DUX, 2HVO, 2FZ8, 4PUW, 4XZH, 4QBX, 4JIR, 2PD9, 3LQL, 1ABN, 2PDW, 4PR4, 2PDI, 3LEP, 2PDJ, 4PUU, 2DV0, 3LEN, 3G5E, 1EF3, 4LB3, 2PDC, 3LBO, 2PDP, 2FZD, 4NKC, 2PZN, 2ISF, 3RX4, 2PDL, 3Q65, 4PRT, 4Q7B, 4QX4, 2FZ9, 2IKJ, 2J8T, 4IGS, 2IS7, 3V35, 1Z8A, 1XGD, 3T42, 2QXW, 4QR6, 1X96, 4RPQ, 2HV5, 2NVC, 2F2K, 3BCJ, 3LZ3, 3V36, 2PDK, 3GHU, 3GHS, 2ACU, 2PDM, 4LAZ, 1T41, 2IKG, 3MB9, 2PDF, 4PRR, 2PDN, 3LQG, 4XZI, 3LZ5, 2AGT, 3S3G, 1PWL, 3M0I, 2PF8, 3RX2, 2IPW, 3MC5, 3DN5, 4QXI, 2HVN, 2INZ, 1X97, 2PDY, 3RX3, 1PWM, 4LBR, 3Q67, 4LAU, 1Z89, 2IKI, 3P2V, 1X98, 1AZ2, 2PFH, 3U2C, 2ACS, 3GHT, 4LB4, 2INE, 1EL3, 2I16, 2IQD, 2PEV, 4LBS, 1ADS, 4YU1, 4YS1
Enzyme activity
EC #	BRENDA	ExPASy	KEGG	MetaCyc
1.1.1.21	↗	↗	↗	↗
1.1.1.54	↗	↗	↗	↗
1.1.1.300	↗	↗	↗	↗
1.1.1.372	↗	↗	↗	↗

Gene location (Human)
Chr.	Chromosome 7 (human)
Band	7q33	Start	134,442,356 bp
Band	7q33	End	134,459,284 bp

Gene location (Mouse)
Chr.	Chromosome 6 (mouse)
Band	6 14.87 cM|6 B1	Start	34,279,369 bp
Band	6 14.87 cM|6 B1	End	34,294,413 bp
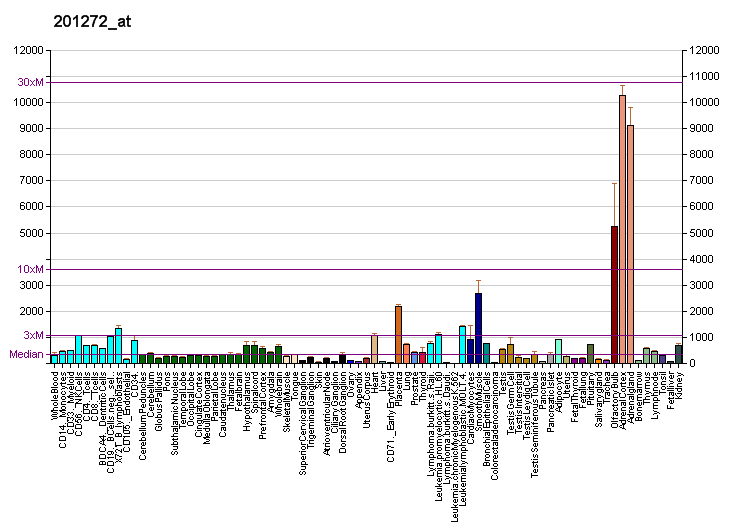
RNA expression pattern
Bgee	Human / Mouse (ortholog); Top expressed in: right adrenal cortex; left adrenal gland; left adrenal cortex; olfactory bulb; spinal ganglia; seminal vesicula; apex of heart; Skeletal muscle tissue of rectus abdominis; trigeminal ganglion; gastrocnemius muscle / Top expressed in: urinary bladder; primary oocyte; secondary oocyte; zygote; adrenal gland; quadriceps femoris muscle; spermatocyte; muscle tissue; skeletal muscle tissue; right kidney; More reference expression data
BioGPS	More reference expression data
Gene ontology
Molecular function	aldo-keto reductase (NADP) activity; electron transfer activity; oxidoreductase activity; glyceraldehyde oxidoreductase activity; alditol:NADP+ 1-oxidoreductase activity; alcohol dehydrogenase (NADP+) activity; retinal dehydrogenase activity; allyl-alcohol dehydrogenase activity; NADP-retinol dehydrogenase activity
Cellular component	mast cell granule; Schwann cell microvillus; Schmidt-Lanterman incisure; nucleoplasm; plasma membrane bounded cell projection cytoplasm; perinuclear region of cytoplasm; paranodal junction; extracellular exosome; extracellular space; cytoplasm; cytosol
Biological process	stress-activated protein kinase signaling cascade; cellular response to peptide; daunorubicin metabolic process; doxorubicin metabolic process; maternal process involved in female pregnancy; monosaccharide metabolic process; norepinephrine metabolic process; fructose biosynthetic process; response to thyroid hormone; response to stress; response to water deprivation; cellular response to methylglyoxal; response to organic substance; C21-steroid hormone biosynthetic process; tissue homeostasis; inner medullary collecting duct development; positive regulation of receptor signaling pathway via JAK-STAT; positive regulation of smooth muscle cell proliferation; cellular response to hydrogen peroxide; sorbitol biosynthetic process; renal water homeostasis; regulation of urine volume; negative regulation of apoptotic process; renal system development; carbohydrate metabolic process; electron transport chain; cellular hyperosmotic salinity response; retinoid metabolic process; metanephric collecting duct development; retinol metabolic process
Sources:Amigo / QuickGO
Orthologs
Databases	NCBI: entry; OMA: entry
Species	Human	Mouse
Entrez	231	11677
Ensembl	ENSG00000085662	ENSMUSG00000001642
UniProt	P15121	P45376
RefSeq (mRNA)	NM_001628; NM_001346142	NM_009658
RefSeq (protein)	NP_001333071; NP_001619	NP_033788
Location (UCSC)	Chr 7: 134.44 – 134.46 Mb	Chr 6: 34.28 – 34.29 Mb
PubMed search
- Wikidata
View/Edit Human	View/Edit Mouse

Aldo-keto reductase family 1, member B1 (AKR1B1) is an gene in humans that encodes the enzyme aldose reductase. It is a reduced nicotinamide-adenine dinucleotide phosphate (NADPH)-dependent enzyme catalyzing the reduction of various aldehydes and ketones to the corresponding alcohol. The involvement of AKR1B1 in oxidative stress diseases, cell signal transduction, and cell proliferation process endows AKR1B1 with potential as a therapeutic target.

== Structure ==
=== Gene ===
The AKR1B1 gene lies on the chromosome location of 7q33 and consists of 10 exons. There are a few putative pseudogenes for this gene, and one of them has been confirmed and mapped to chromosome 3.

=== Protein ===
AKR1B1 consists of 316 amino acid residues and weighs 35853Da. It does not possess the traditional dinucleotide binding fold. The way it binds NADPH differs from other nucleotide adenine dinucleotide-dependent enzymes. The active site pocket of human aldose reductase is relatively hydrophobic, lined by seven aromatic and four other non-polar residues.

== Function ==
AR belongs to the aldehyde-keto reductase superfamily, with a widely expression in human organs including the kidney, lens, retina, nerve, heart, placenta, brain, skeletal muscle, testis, blood vessels, lung, and liver. It is a reduced nicotinamide-adenine dinucleotide phosphate (NADPH)-dependent enzyme catalyzing the reduction of various aldehydes and ketones to the corresponding alcohol. It also participates in glucose metabolism and osmoregulation and plays a protective role against toxic aldehydes derived from lipid peroxidation and steroidogenesis.

== Clinical significance ==
Under diabetic conditions AR converts glucose into sorbitol, which is then converted to fructose. 20466987 It has been found to play an important role in many diabetes complications such as diabetes retinopathy and renopathy. It is also involved in many oxidative stress diseases, cell signal transduction, and cell proliferation process including cardiovascular disorders, sepsis, and cancer.

It has been reported that the action of AR contributes to the activation of retinal microglia, suggesting that inhibition of AR may be of a therapeutic importance to reduce inflammation associated with activation of RMG. Adapting AR inhibitors could as well prevent sepsis complications, prevent angiogenesis, ameliorate mild or asymptomatic diabetic cardiovascular autonomic neuropathy and may be a promising strategy for the treatment of endotoxemia and other ROS-induced inflammatory diseases.

== Interactions ==
AKR1B1 has been found to interact with:

- ginsenoside 20(S)-Rh2
- alkaloid
- carboxylic acid derivatives
- spirohydantoins
- cyclic amides
