= PTS Galactitol Family =

The PTS Galactitol (Gat) Family (TC# 4.A.5) is part of the PTS-AG superfamily. The biochemistry of this family is poorly defined. The only well-characterized member of this family is the galactitol permease of Escherichia coli. However, a homologous IIC protein from Listeria monocytogenes has been shown to be required for D-arabitol fermentation. It presumably functions together with IIA^{Gat} and IIB^{Gat} homologues. IIC^{Gat} is distantly related to IIC^{Sgc} of E. coli; IIA^{Gat} is distantly related to IIA^{Sga} and IIA^{Sgc}of E. coli as well as IIA^{Mtl} and IIA^{Fru}. IIB^{Gat} is distantly related to IIB^{Sga} and IIB^{Sgc} of E. coli. Domains in the LicR/CelR family of transcriptional activators show C-terminal domains exhibiting weak sequence similarity to IIB^{Gat} and IIA^{Gat}.
