= Sorbitol dehydrogenase =

Enzyme found in humans

SORD
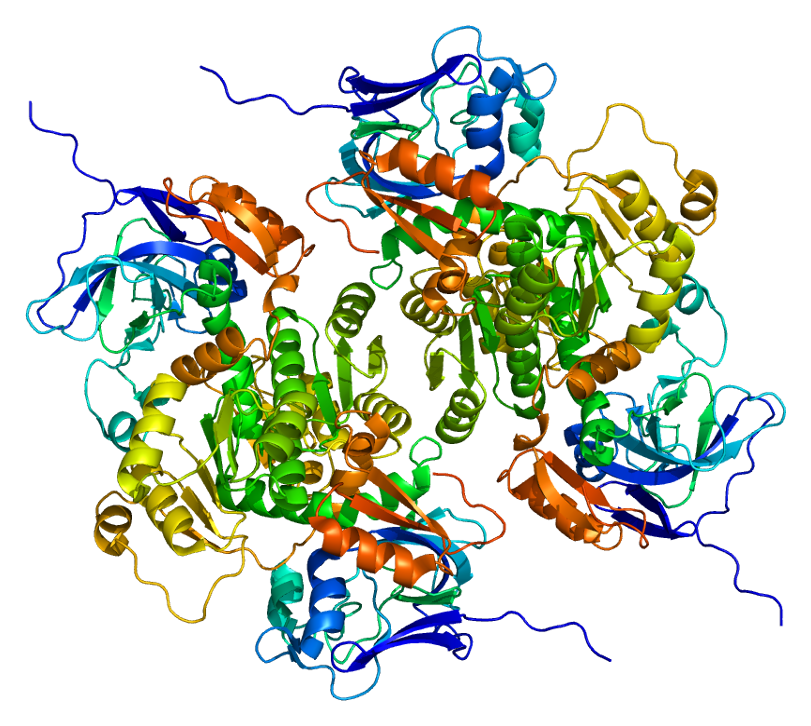

Identifiers
- Aliases: SORD, HEL-S-95n, SORD1, sorbitol dehydrogenase, XDH, RDH, SDH, SORDD
- External IDs: OMIM: 182500; MGI: 98266; GeneCards: SORD
Available structures
PDB	Ortholog search: PDBe RCSB
PDB	List of PDB id codes 1PL8, 1PL6, 1PL7
Enzyme activity
EC #	BRENDA	ExPASy	KEGG	MetaCyc
1.1.1.4	↗	↗	↗	↗
1.1.1.9	↗	↗	↗	↗
1.1.1.14	↗	↗	↗	↗
1.1.1.56	↗	↗	↗	↗

Gene location (Human)
Chr.	Chromosome 15 (human)
Band	15q21.1	Start	45,023,147 bp
Band	15q21.1	End	45,077,185 bp

Gene location (Mouse)
Chr.	Chromosome 2 (mouse)
Band	2 E5|2 60.59 cM	Start	122,065,230 bp
Band	2 E5|2 60.59 cM	End	122,095,821 bp
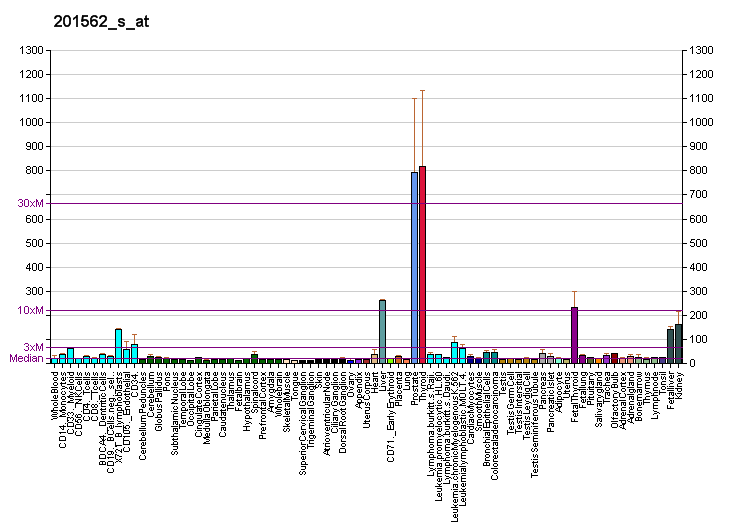

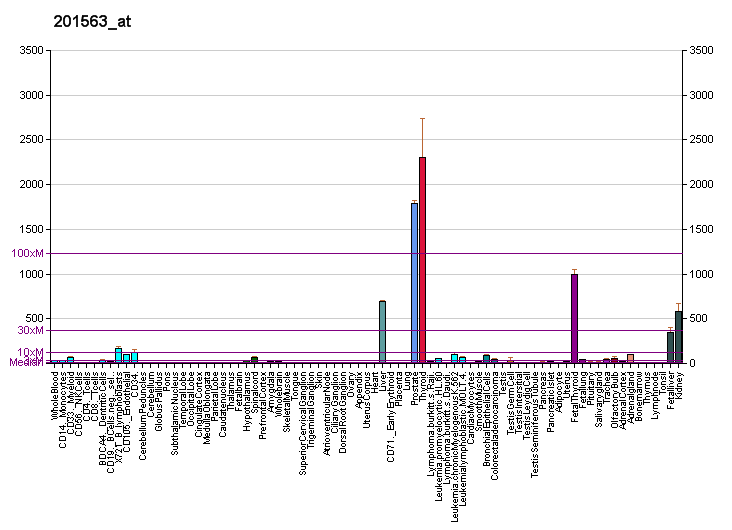
RNA expression pattern
Bgee	Human / Mouse (ortholog); Top expressed in: right lobe of thyroid gland; left lobe of thyroid gland; right lobe of liver; olfactory zone of nasal mucosa; prostate; right adrenal cortex; left adrenal gland; left adrenal cortex; islet of Langerhans; ventricular zone / Top expressed in: seminiferous tubule; spermatid; right kidney; spermatocyte; left lobe of liver; human kidney; seminal vesicula; morula; blastocyst; myocardium of ventricle; More reference expression data
BioGPS	More reference expression data
Gene ontology
Molecular function	NAD binding; zinc ion binding; metal ion binding; L-iditol 2-dehydrogenase activity; oxidoreductase activity; D-xylulose reductase activity; carbohydrate binding; identical protein binding; (R,R)-butanediol dehydrogenase activity; ribitol 2-dehydrogenase activity
Cellular component	cytosol; cell projection; membrane; mitochondrial membranes; cilium; mitochondrion; motile cilium; extracellular exosome; extracellular space
Biological process	flagellated sperm motility; response to cadmium ion; response to copper ion; sorbitol catabolic process; fructose biosynthetic process; glucuronate catabolic process to xylulose 5-phosphate; response to osmotic stress; L-xylitol metabolic process; response to nutrient levels; glucose metabolic process; L-xylitol catabolic process; response to hormone; sorbitol metabolic process
Sources:Amigo / QuickGO
Orthologs
Databases	NCBI: entry; OMA: entry
Species	Human	Mouse
Entrez	6652	20322
Ensembl	ENSG00000140263	ENSMUSG00000027227
UniProt	Q00796	Q64442
RefSeq (mRNA)	NM_003104	NM_146126
RefSeq (protein)	NP_003095	NP_666238
Location (UCSC)	Chr 15: 45.02 – 45.08 Mb	Chr 2: 122.07 – 122.1 Mb
PubMed search
- Wikidata
View/Edit Human	View/Edit Mouse

Sorbitol dehydrogenase (or SDH) is an enzyme that in humans is encoded by the gene SORD.

Sorbitol dehydrogenase is an enzyme in carbohydrate metabolism converting sorbitol, the sugar alcohol form of glucose, into fructose. Together with aldose reductase, it provides a way for the body to produce fructose from glucose without using ATP. Sorbitol dehydrogenase uses NAD^{+} as a cofactor; its reaction is sorbitol + NAD^{+} → fructose + NADH + H^{+}. A zinc ion is also involved in catalysis. Organs that use it most frequently include the liver and seminal vesicle; it is found in various organisms from bacteria to humans. A secondary use is the metabolism of dietary sorbitol, though sorbitol is known not to be absorbed as well in the intestine as its related compounds glucose and fructose, and is usually found in quite small amounts in the diet (except when used as an artificial sweetener).

== Structure ==
The structure of human sorbitol dehydrogenase was determined through crystallization experiments and X-ray diffraction (with a resolution of 2.20 Å). The method used for crystallization was “Vapor Diffusion, Hanging Drop” at pH 6.2 and at a temperature of 295.0 K. Sorbitol dehydrogenase consists of four identical chains (A, B, C, D), each of which being 31% helical (14 helices) and 26% beta sheet (23 strands). MolProbity Ramachandran analysis was conducted by Lovell, Davis, et al. The results were that 97.1% of all residues were in favored regions and 100.0% of all residues were in allowed regions, with no outliers. All four chains have 356 residues each and a catalytic site. The catalytic sites contain both a serine and a histidine residue, which are hydrophilic sidechains. The residues require NAD+ and a zinc ion to be present for catalytic activity. Sorbitol dehydrogenase belongs to the oxidoreductase family, which means that it helps catalyze oxidation reduction reactions. As stated above, the enzyme helps in the pathway of converting glucose into fructose.

== Subunit interactions in SDH ==
The interactions between subunits forming a tetramer in SDH is determined by non-covalent interaction. These non-covalent interactions consists of a hydrophobic effect, hydrogen bonds, and electrostatic interactions between the four identical subunits. For homotetrameric proteins such as SDH, the structure is believed to have evolved going from a monomeric to a dimeric and finally toward a tetrameric structure in evolution. The SDH proteins have a close evolutionary relationship with alcohol dehydrogenase, which also belongs to the protein superfamily of medium-chain dehydrogenase/reductase enzymes (MDRs). Mammalian ADHs are all dimeric enzymes but certain bacterial ADHs also share a tetrameric quaternary structure. SDH from silver leaf whitefly and that from yeast ADH1 both lack a structural zinc site and share a tetrameric quaternary structure, thus showing a close evolutionary relationship from a structural viewpoint between the two classes of proteins (ADH and SDH).

The general binding process in SDH is described by the gain in free energy, which can be determined from the rate of association and dissociation between subunits.

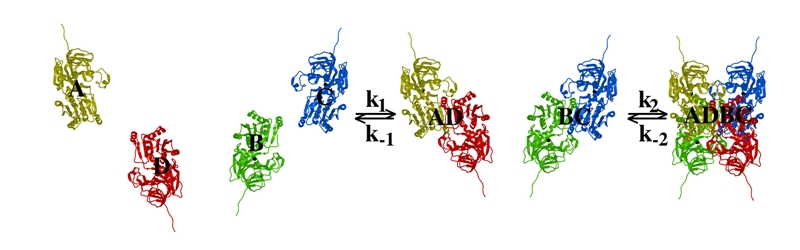
Assembly of the four subunits (A,B,C and D) in SDH

A hydrogen-bonding network between subunits has been shown to be important for the stability of the tetrameric quaternary protein structure. For example, a study of SDH that used diverse methods such as protein sequence alignments, structural comparisons, energy calculations, gelfiltration experiments, and enzyme kinetics experiments could reveal an important hydrogen-bonding network that stabilizes the tetrameric quaternary structure in mammalian SDH.

== Clinical significance ==
In tissues where sorbitol dehydrogenase is low or absent, such as in the retina, lens, kidney, and nerve cells, sorbitol can accumulate under conditions of hyperglycemia. In uncontrolled diabetes, large amounts of glucose enter these tissues and is then converted to sorbitol by aldose reductase. Sorbitol then accumulates, causing water to be drawn into the cell due to the increased osmotic pressure, impairing tissue function. Retinopathy, cataract formation, nephropathy, and peripheral neuropathy seen in diabetes are partly due to this phenomenon.
