= Phosphocarrier protein =

Phosphotransferase system, phosphocarrier HPr protein
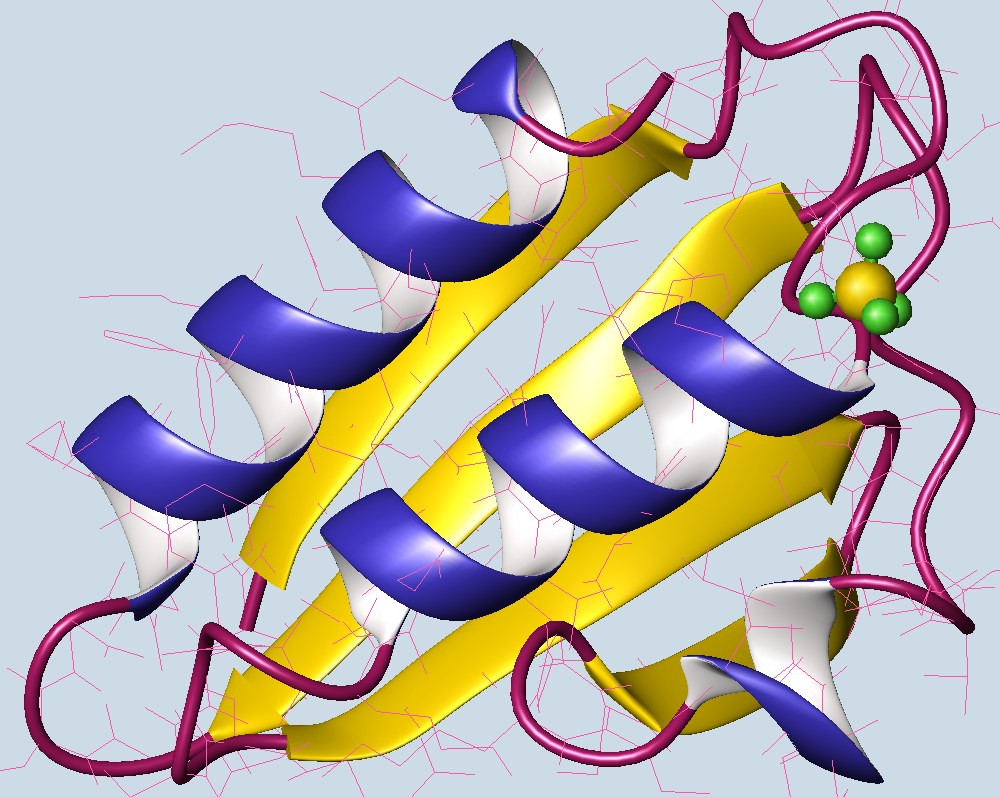
- Phosphocarrier protein HPr, E. coli

Identifiers
- Symbol: PTS_HPr_protein
- Pfam: PF00381
- InterPro: IPR000032
- PROSITE: PDOC00318
- SCOP2: 1ptf / SCOPe / SUPFAM
Available protein structures:
- PDB: 1cm2, 1cm3, 1fu0, 1ggr, 1hdn, 1j6t, 1jem, 1k1c, 1ka5, 1kkl IPR000032 PF00381 (ECOD; PDBsum)
- AlphaFold: IPR000032; PF00381

Histidine-containing phosphocarrier protein (HPr) is a small cytoplasmic protein that is a component of the phosphoenolpyruvate-dependent sugar phosphotransferase system (PTS).

The phosphoenolpyruvate-dependent sugar phosphotransferase system (PTS) is a major carbohydrate transport system in bacteria. The PTS catalyses the phosphorylation of sugar substrates during their translocation across the cell membrane. The mechanism involves the transfer of a phosphoryl group from phosphoenolpyruvate (PEP) via enzyme I (EI) to enzyme II (EII) of the PTS system, which in turn transfers it to a phosphocarrier protein (HPr). In some bacteria HPr is a domain in a larger protein that includes an EIII(Fru) (IIA) domain and in some cases also an EI domain.

There is a conserved histidine in the N-terminus of HPr, which serves as an acceptor for the phosphoryl group of EI. In the central part of HPr there is a conserved serine which, in most Gram-positive bacteria and certain Gram-negative bacteria, is phosphorylated by an ATP-dependent protein kinase, a process which probably plays a regulatory role in sugar transport.
