= Saccharide transporter =

Multi-protein system

Phosphotransferase system, EIIC
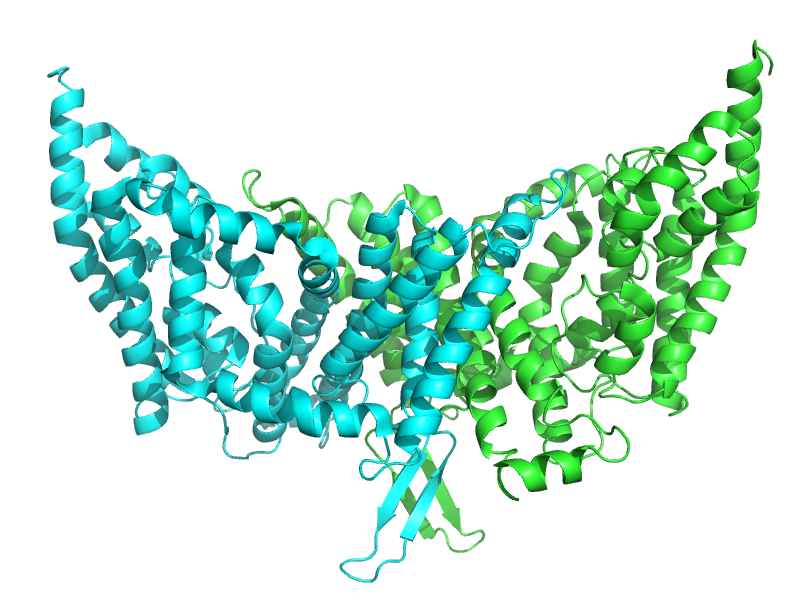
- Crystal structure of a phosphorylation-coupled saccharide transporter. PDB 3qnq.

Identifiers
- Symbol: PTS_EIIC
- Pfam: PF02378
- Pfam clan: CL0493
- InterPro: IPR003352
- TCDB: 4.A.3
- OPM superfamily: 226
- OPM protein: 3qnq
Available protein structures:
- PDB: IPR003352 PF02378 (ECOD; PDBsum)
- AlphaFold: IPR003352; PF02378

The bacterial phosphoenolpyruvate: sugar phosphotransferase system (PTS) is a multi-protein system involved in the regulation of a variety of metabolic and transcriptional processes. The PTS catalyzes the phosphorylation of incoming sugar substrates concomitant with their translocation across the cell membrane. The general mechanism of the PTS is the following: a phosphoryl group from phosphoenolpyruvate (PEP) is transferred to enzyme-I (EI) of PTS which in turn transfers it to a phosphoryl carrier protein (HPr). Phospho-HPr then transfers the phosphoryl group to a sugar-specific permease which consists of at least three structurally distinct domains (IIA, IIB, and IIC) which can either be fused together in a single polypeptide chain or exist as two or three interactive chains, formerly called enzymes II (EII) and III (EIII). The IIC domain catalyzes the transfer of a phosphoryl group from IIB to the sugar substrate.
