= Govorestat =

Chemical compound

Clinical data
- Other names: AT-007
- ATC code: A16AX24 (WHO)

Identifiers
- IUPAC name: 2-[4-Oxo-3-[[5-(trifluoromethyl)-1,3-benzothiazol-2-yl]methyl]thieno[3,4-d]pyridazin-1-yl]acetic acid
- CAS Number: 2170729-29-8
- PubChem CID: 132260161
- DrugBank: DB16707
- ChemSpider: 81409264
- UNII: 6JLQ8K35KK
- ChEMBL: ChEMBL4650327

Chemical and physical data
- Formula: C_{17}H_{10}F_{3}N_{3}O_{3}S_{2}
- Molar mass: 425.40 g·mol^{−1}
- 3D model (JSmol): Interactive image
- SMILES: C1=CC2=C(C=C1C(F)(F)F)N=C(S2)CN3C(=O)C4=CSC=C4C(=N3)CC(=O)O
- InChI: InChI=1S/C17H10F3N3O3S2/c18-17(19,20)8-1-2-13-12(3-8)21-14(28-13)5-23-16(26)10-7-27-6-9(10)11(22-23)4-15(24)25/h1-3,6-7H,4-5H2,(H,24,25); Key:ORQGHAJIWGGFJK-UHFFFAOYSA-N

Govorestat (AT-007) is an aldose reductase inhibitor and experimental drug to treat galactosemia and sorbitol dehydrogenase deficiency.

After a report circulating on the internet accused the developer Applied Therapeutics of cutting corners in its studies of the drug, the FDA put a hold on it in 2020. Applied Therapeutics said that the report was a fraudulent attempt to manipulate its stock price.

In February 2024, the FDA granted priority review states to an application from Applied Therapeutics to use govorestat to treat galactosemia, a metabolic disease. The FDA then rejected the company’s application in November 2024, and issued a warning letter to then-President Shoshana Shendelman informing her of “objectionable conditions” observed during an FDA inspection earlier that year.

== Society and culture ==
=== Legal status ===
In December 2024, Advanz Pharma Limited withdrew its application for a marketing authorization of Nugalviq for the treatment of classic galactosaemia, a condition where the body cannot break down a sugar called galactose.
