= PTS-GFL superfamily =

Large group of transport proteins

The phosphotransferases system (PTS-GFL) superfamily is a superfamily of phosphotransferase enzymes that facilitate the transport of glucose, glucitol (G), fructose (F) and lactose (L). Classification has been established through phylogenic analysis and bioinformatics.

The bacterial phosphoenolpyruvate:sugar phosphotransferase system (PTS) transports and phosphorylates its sugar substrates in a single energy-coupled step. This transport process is dependent on several cytoplasmic phosphoryl transfer proteins - Enzyme I (I), HPr, Enzyme IIA (IIA), and Enzyme IIB (IIB)) as well as the integral membrane sugar permease (IIC). The PTS Enzyme II complexes are derived from independently evolving 4 PTS Enzyme II complex superfamilies, that include the (1) Glucose (Glc),(2) Mannose (Man), (3) Ascorbate-Galactitol (Asc-Gat) and (4) Dihydroxyacetone (Dha) superfamilies.

The four families that make up the PTS-GFL superfamily include:

- 4.A.1 – The PTS Glucose-Glucoside (Glc) Family
- 4.A.2 – The PTS Fructose-Mannitol (Fru) Family
- 4.A.3 – The PTS Lactose-N,N'-Diacetylchitobiose-β-glucoside (Lac) Family
- 4.A.4 – The PTS Glucitol (Gut) Family

== See also ==
- Phosphotransferases system
