= Polyol pathway =

Series of interconnected biochemical reactions

The polyol pathway is a two-step process that converts glucose to fructose. In this pathway glucose is reduced to sorbitol, which is subsequently oxidized to fructose. It is also called the sorbitol-aldose reductase pathway.

The pathway is implicated in diabetic complications, especially in microvascular damage to the retina, kidney, and nerves.

Sorbitol cannot cross cell membranes, and, when it accumulates, it produces osmotic stresses on cells by drawing water into the insulin-independent tissues.

== Pathway ==
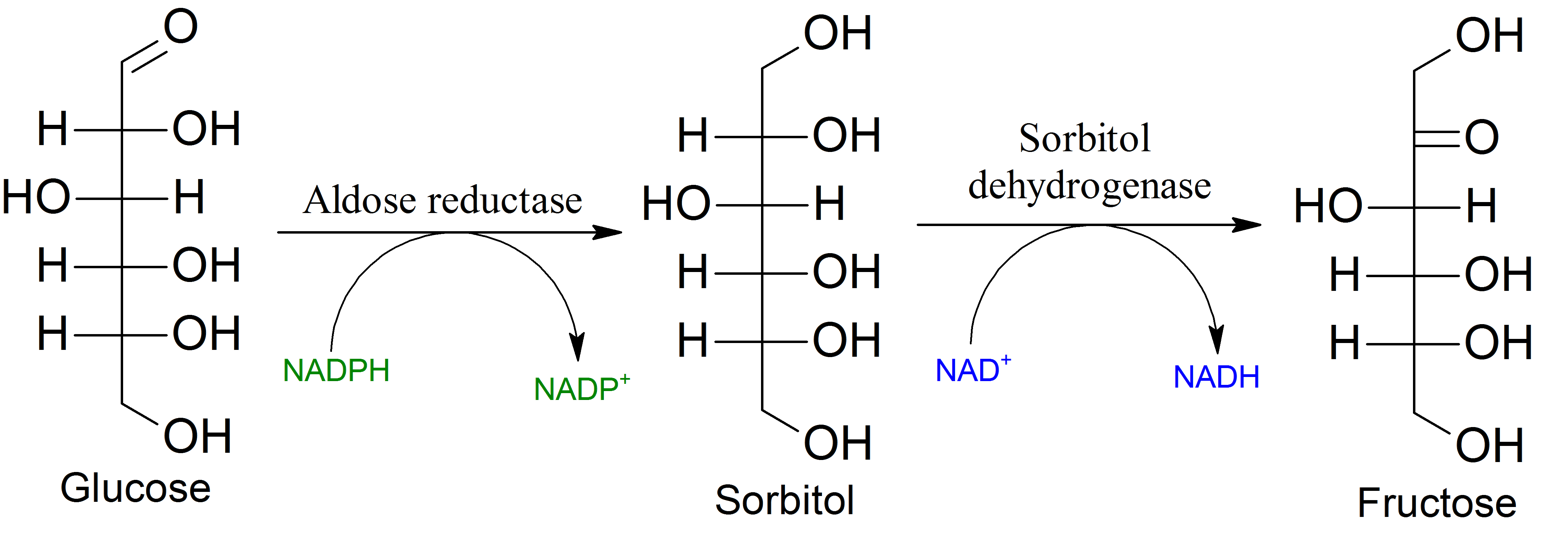
The polyol metabolic pathway.

Cells use glucose for energy. This normally occurs by phosphorylation from the enzyme hexokinase. However, if large amounts of glucose are present (as in diabetes mellitus), hexokinase becomes saturated and the excess glucose enters the polyol pathway when aldose reductase reduces it to sorbitol. This reaction oxidizes NADPH to NADP+. Sorbitol dehydrogenase can then oxidize sorbitol to fructose, which produces NADH from NAD+. Hexokinase can return the molecule to the glycolysis pathway by phosphorylating fructose to form fructose-6-phosphate. However, in uncontrolled diabetics that have high blood glucose - more than the glycolysis pathway can handle - the reactions mass balance ultimately favors the production of sorbitol.

Activation of the polyol pathway results in a decrease of reduced NADPH and oxidized NAD+; these are necessary co-factors in redox reactions throughout the body, and under normal conditions they are not interchangeable. The decreased concentration of these NADPH leads to decreased synthesis of reduced glutathione, nitric oxide, myo-inositol, and taurine. Myo-inositol is particularly required for the normal function of nerves. Sorbitol may also glycate nitrogens on proteins, such as collagen, and the products of these glycations are referred-to as AGEs - advanced glycation end-products. AGEs are thought to cause disease in the human body, one effect of which is mediated by RAGE (receptor for advanced glycation end-products) and the ensuing inflammatory responses induced. They are seen in the hemoglobin A1C tests performed on known diabetics to assess their levels of glucose control.

== Pathology ==
While most cells require the action of insulin for glucose to gain entry into the cell, the cells of the retina, kidney, and nervous tissues are insulin-independent, so glucose moves freely across the cell membrane, regardless of the action of insulin. The cells will use glucose for energy as normal, and any glucose not used for energy will enter the polyol pathway. When blood glucose is normal (about 100 mg/dL or 5.5 mmol/L), this interchange causes no problems, as aldose reductase has a low affinity for glucose at normal concentrations.

In a hyperglycemic state, the affinity of aldose reductase for glucose rises, causing much sorbitol to accumulate, and using much more NADPH, leaving less NADPH for other processes of cellular metabolism. This change of affinity is what is meant by activation of the pathway. The amount of sorbitol that accumulates, however, may not be sufficient to cause osmotic influx of water.

NADPH acts to promote nitric oxide production and glutathione reduction, and its deficiency will cause glutathione deficiency. A glutathione deficiency, congenital or acquired, can lead to hemolysis caused by oxidative stress. Nitric oxide is one of the important vasodilators in blood vessels. Therefore, NADPH prevents reactive oxygen species from accumulating and damaging cells.

Excessive activation of the polyol pathway increases intracellular and extracellular sorbitol concentrations, increased concentrations of reactive oxygen species, and decreased concentrations of nitric oxide and glutathione. Each of these imbalances can damage cells; in diabetes there are several acting together. It has not been conclusively determined that activating the polyol pathway damages the microvascular systems.

=== Endogenous fructose production ===
While the polyol pathway is traditionally associated with diabetic complications due to sorbitol accumulation, recent research has highlighted the metabolic role of the fructose produced. Under conditions of hyperglycemia, the activation of this pathway can lead to significant production of "endogenous fructose" in the liver and kidney. Review articles suggest that this endogenously produced fructose is metabolized by ketohexokinase, leading to ATP depletion, uric acid generation, and the stimulation of lipogenesis. This mechanism has been proposed as a contributing factor to the development of fatty liver and metabolic syndrome.

== Further references ==
- Harper's Illustrated Biochemistry(Published by LANGE)
- Dinesh Puri's Medical Biochemistry(Published by ELSEVIER)
