= Zenarestat =

Names
- Preferred IUPAC name {3-[(4-Bromo-2-fluorophenyl)methyl]-7-chloro-2,4-dioxo-3,4-dihydroquinazolin-1(2H)-yl}acetic acid

Identifiers
CAS Number	112733-06-9
3D model (JSmol)	Interactive image
ChemSpider	5522
IUPHAR/BPS	7418
KEGG	D03807
PubChem CID	5724
UNII	180C9PJ8JT
CompTox Dashboard (EPA)	DTXSID0047296
- InChI: InChI=1S/C17H11BrClFN2O4/c18-10-2-1-9(13(20)5-10)7-22-16(25)12-4-3-11(19)6-14(12)21(17(22)26)8-15(23)24/h1-6H,7-8H2,(H,23,24) Key: SXONDGSPUVNZLO-UHFFFAOYSA-N; InChI=1/C17H11BrClFN2O4/c18-10-2-1-9(13(20)5-10)7-22-16(25)12-4-3-11(19)6-14(12)21(17(22)26)8-15(23)24/h1-6H,7-8H2,(H,23,24) Key: SXONDGSPUVNZLO-UHFFFAOYAB
- SMILES: C1=CC2=C(C=C1Cl)N(C(=O)N(C2=O)CC3=C(C=C(C=C3)Br)F)CC(=O)O

Properties
Chemical formula	C_{17}H_{11}BrClFN_{2}O_{4}
Molar mass	441.64 g/mol
Melting point	223 to 224 °C (433 to 435 °F; 496 to 497 K)
- Except where otherwise noted, data are given for materials in their standard state (at 25 °C [77 °F], 100 kPa). Infobox references

Zenarestat (FK-366; FR-74366) is an aldose reductase inhibitor. It was investigated as a treatment of diabetic neuropathy and cataract, but its development was terminated.
