= Glyconeogenesis =

Glyconeogenesis is the synthesis of glycogen without using glucose or other carbohydrates, instead using substances like proteins and fats. This includes substrates like glycerol, lactate, glutamine and alanine. It's used in replenishing glycogen stores when glucose is limited, like after long periods of fasting. In the liver and kidneys, it uses the enzymes phosphoenolpyruvate carboxykinase 2 (PCK2), fructose-1,6-bisphosphatase 1 (FBP1), and fructose-1,6-bisphosphatase 2 in skeletal muscle. One example is the conversion of lactic acid to glycogen in the liver. Lactic acid is converted to alanine, the alanine is transferred to the liver, and once in the liver is it converted back to alanine where it is free to be transformed into glucose.

== Role in tumor survival ==
Outside of the liver, M1 class macrophages, a pro-inflammatory white blood cell, use glyconeogenesis through the same enzymes, PCK2 and FBP1. M1 cells concentrate in inflammation, infection, and cancerous sites. These harsh environments are described as being hypoglycemic or waste-rich in compounds such as lactic acid, making glyconeogenesis particularly resourceful. In lung cancer, tumor-associated macrophages are found to exhibit M1-type properties such as the use of glyconeogenesis. The tumor microenvironment is rich in lactic acid, signaling cytokine release to TAMs for the conversion of surrounding lactic acid into glycogen.

== Fasting ==
Research on fasting using crustacean animal models, particularly the Chasmagnathus granulatus, show for differences in glyconeogenic activity based on diet. The study looked at the effects of a fast while being on a high-carbohydrate diet compared to a high-protein diet. After two weeks, the high-protein diet increased glyconeogenic activity while the high-carbohydrate diet showed a reduction in overall glyconeogenic capacity.

== See also ==
- Gluconeogenesis
