= PTS Lactose-N,N'-Diacetylchitobiose Family =

The PTS Lactose-N,N’-Diacetylchitobiose (Lac) Family (TC# 4.A.3) includes several sequenced lactose porters of Gram-positive bacteria, as well as the Escherichia coli and Borrelia burgdorferi N,N'-diacetylchitobiose (Chb) porters. It is part of the PTS-GFL superfamily. The former can transport aromatic β-glucosides and cellobiose, as well as Chb. However, only Chb induces expression of the chb operon.

== Structure ==
While the Lac porters consist of two polypeptide chains (IIA and IICB), the Chb porters of E. coli and B. burgdorferi consist of three (IIA, IIB and IIC). In E. coli, the IIA^{Chb} protein has been shown to form a stable dimer both when phosphorylated and when unphosphorylated. The IIC domains of these permeases are believed to have a uniform topology with 8 TMSs.

=== Lac porters in E. coli ===
In E. coli, the IIB^{Chb} is a monomer. Two IIB^{Chb} monomers associate with the IIA^{Chb} dimer. The structure of the IIB domain of the Chb porter has been determined both by NMR and by X-ray crystallography. It exhibits an α/β doubly wound superfold. This is different from the structure of the IIB^{Glc} and IIB^{Man}domains. IIB^{Sgc}, believed to function in pentose transport, is homologous to IIB^{Lac} and IIB^{Chb}. In Bacillus cereus, the crystal structure of the Chb protein is known. The IIC domains of members of the Lac family are all more similar to each other than they are to those of the Glc, Bgl, Fru and Mtl families.
