= PEP group translocation =

Bacterial metabolic pathway

PEP (phosphoenol pyruvate) group translocation, also known as the phosphotransferase system or PTS, is a distinct method used by bacteria for sugar uptake where the source of energy is from phosphoenolpyruvate (PEP). It is known to be a multicomponent system that always involves enzymes of the plasma membrane and those in the cytoplasm.

The PTS system uses active transport. After the translocation across the membrane, the metabolites transported are modified. The PTS system was discovered by Saul Roseman in 1964. The bacterial phosphoenolpyruvate:sugar phosphotransferase system (PTS) transports and phosphorylates its sugar substrates in a single energy-coupled step. This transport process is dependent on several cytoplasmic phosphoryl transfer proteins - Enzyme I (I), HPr, Enzyme IIA (IIA), and Enzyme IIB (IIB)) as well as the integral membrane sugar permease (IIC).The PTS Enzyme II complexes are derived from independently evolving 4 PTS Enzyme II complex superfamilies, that include the (1) Glucose (Glc), (2) Mannose (Man), (3) Ascorbate-Galactitol (Asc-Gat) and (4) Dihydroxyacetone (DHA) superfamilies.

== Specificity ==
The phosphotransferase system is involved in transporting many sugars into bacteria, including glucose, mannose, fructose, and cellobiose. PTS sugars can differ between bacterial groups, mirroring the most suitable carbon sources available in the environment every group evolved. In Escherichia coli, there are 21 different transporters (i.e. IIC proteins, sometimes fused to IIA and/or IIB proteins, see figure) which determine import specificity. Of these, 7 belong to the fructose (Fru) family, 7 belong to the glucose (Glc) family, and 7 belong to the other PTS permease families.

== Mechanism ==
The phosphoryl group on PEP is eventually transferred to the imported sugar via several proteins. The phosphoryl group is transferred to the Phosphoenolpyruvate-protein phosphotransferase (EI), Histidine Protein (HPr, Heat-stable Protein) and Enzyme E II (EII) to a conserved histidine residue, whereas in the Enzyme E II B (EIIB) the phosphoryl group is usually transferred to a cysteine residue and rarely to a histidine.

The glucose PTS system in E. coli and B. subtilis. The pathway can be read from right to left, with glucose entering the cell and having a phosphate group transferred to it by EIIB. The mannose PTS in E. coli has the same overall structure as the B. subtilis glucose PTS, i.e. the IIABC domains are fused into one protein.

In the process of glucose PTS transport specific of enteric bacteria, PEP transfers its phosphoryl to a histidine residue on EI. EI in turn transfers the phosphate to HPr. From HPr the phosphoryl is transferred to EIIA. EIIA is specific for glucose and it further transfers the phosphoryl group to a juxtamembrane EIIB. Finally, EIIB phosphorylates glucose as it crosses the plasma membrane through the transmembrane enzyme II C (EIIC), forming glucose-6-phosphate. The benefit of transforming glucose into glucose-6-phosphate is that it will not leak out of the cell, therefore providing a one-way concentration gradient of glucose. The HPr is common to the phosphotransferase systems of the other substrates mentioned earlier, as is the upstream EI.

Proteins downstream of HPr tend to vary between the different sugars. The transfer of a phosphate group to the substrate once it has been imported through the membrane transporter prevents the transporter from recognizing the substrate again, thus maintaining a concentration gradient that favours further import of the substrate through the transporter.

=== Specificity ===
In many bacteria, there are four different sets of IIA, IIB, and IIC proteins, each specific for a particular sugar (glucose, mannitol, mannose, and lactose/chitobiose). To make things more complicated, IIA may be fused to IIB to form a single protein with 2 domains, or IIB may be fused to IIC (the transporter), also with 2 domains.

=== Regulation ===
With the glucose phosphotransferase system, the phosphorylation status of EIIA can have regulatory functions. For example, at low glucose concentrations phosphorylated EIIA accumulates and this activates membrane-bound adenylate cyclase. Intracellular cyclic AMP levels rise and this then activates CAP (catabolite activator protein), which is involved in the catabolite repression system, also known as glucose effect. When the glucose concentration is high, EIIA is mostly dephosphorylated and this allows it to inhibit adenylate cyclase, glycerol kinase, lactose permease, and maltose permease. Thus, in addition to being an efficient way to import substrates into the bacterium, the PEP group translocation system also links this transport to regulation of other relevant proteins.

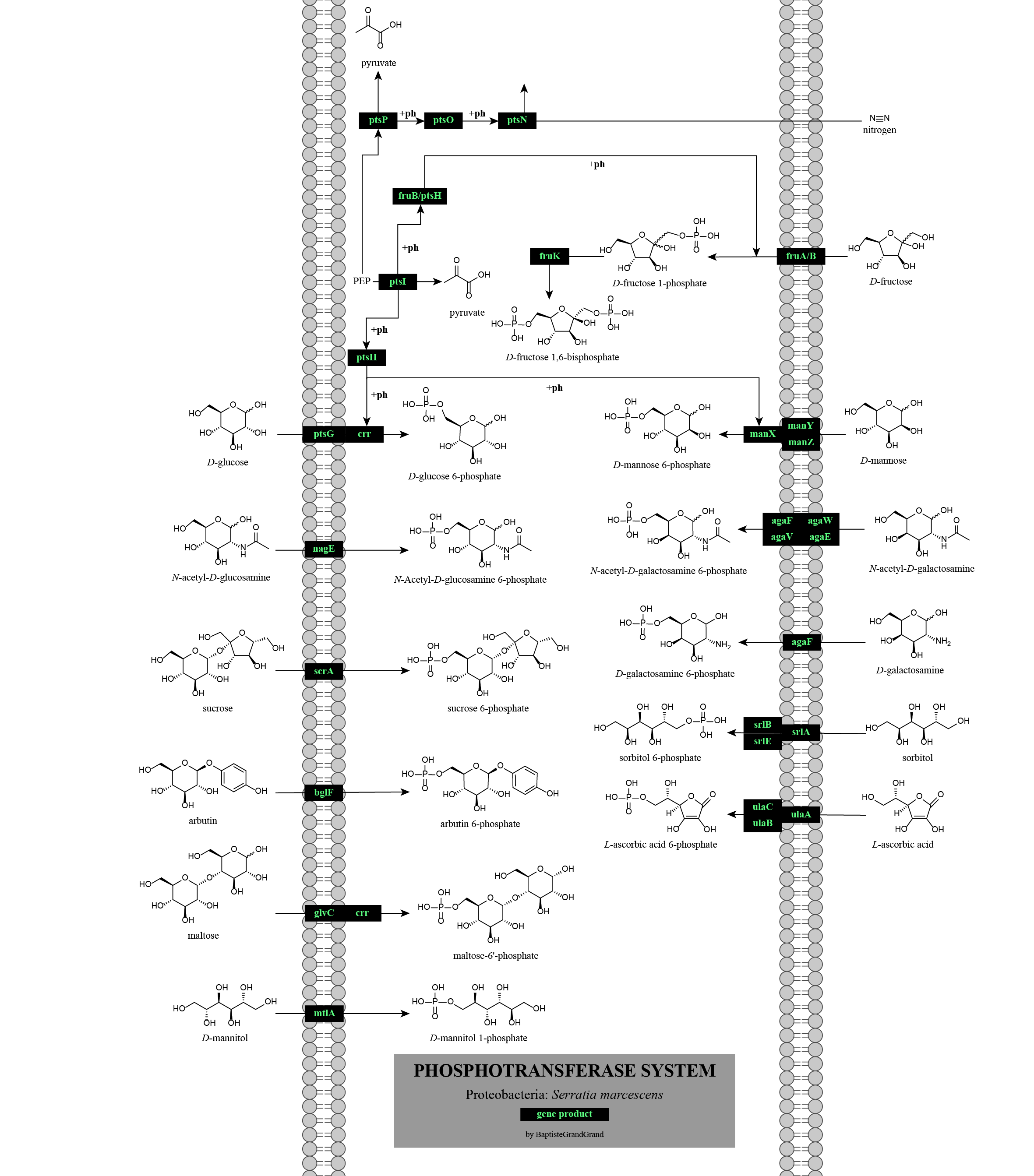
In Serratia marcescens.

== Structural analysis ==
Three-dimensional structures of examples of all the soluble, cytoplasmic complexes of the PTS were solved by G. Marius Clore using multidimensional NMR spectroscopy, and led to significant insights into how signal transduction proteins recognize multiple, structurally dissimilar partners by generating similar binding surfaces from completely different structural elements, making use of large binding surfaces with intrinsic redundancy, and exploiting side chain conformational plasticity.
