= Permease of phosphotransferase system =

Family of transport proteins

Phosphotransferase permease

Identifiers
- Symbol: PTS
- Pfam: PF03611
- InterPro: IPR004703
- TCDB: 4.A.7
- OPM superfamily: 426
- OPM protein: 5zov
Available protein structures:
- Pfam: structures / ECOD
- PDB: RCSB PDB; PDBe; PDBj
- PDBsum: structure summary

Permease of phosphotransferase system (or PTS-AG superfamily according to TCDB) is a superfamily of phosphotransferase enzymes that facilitate the transport of L-ascorbate (A) and galactitol (G). Classification has been established through phylogenic analysis and bioinformatics.

The bacterial phosphoenolpyruvate:sugar phosphotransferase system (PTS) transports and phosphorylates its sugar substrates in a single energy-coupled step. This transport process is dependent on several cytoplasmic phosphoryl transfer proteins - Enzyme I (I), HPr, Enzyme IIA (IIA), and Enzyme IIB (IIB)) as well as the integral membrane sugar permease (IIC). The PTS Enzyme II complexes are derived from independently evolving 4 PTS Enzyme II complex superfamilies, that include the (1) Glucose (Glc),(2) Mannose (Man), (3) Ascorbate-Galactitol (Asc-Gat) and (4) Dihydroxyacetone (Dha) superfamilies.

The four families that make up the PTS-GFL superfamily include:

- 4.A.5 – The PTS Galactitol (Glc) Family
- 4.A.7 – The PTS L-Ascorbate (L-Asc) Family

== See also ==
- Phosphotransferases system
