= Ranirestat =

Names
- Preferred IUPAC name (3R)-2′-[(4-Bromo-2-fluorophenyl)methyl]-1′H-spiro[pyrrolidine-3,4′-pyrrolo[1,2-a]pyrazine]-1′,2,3′,5(2′H)-tetrone

Identifiers
CAS Number	147254-64-6
3D model (JSmol)	Interactive image
ChemSpider	135685
PubChem CID	153948
UNII	Z26P56GFTV
CompTox Dashboard (EPA)	DTXSID80163642
- InChI: InChI=1S/C17H11BrFN3O4/c18-10-4-3-9(11(19)6-10)8-21-14(24)12-2-1-5-22(12)17(16(21)26)7-13(23)20-15(17)25/h1-6H,7-8H2,(H,20,23,25)/t17-/m1/s1 Key: QCVNMNYRNIMDKV-QGZVFWFLSA-N; InChI=1/C17H11BrFN3O4/c18-10-4-3-9(11(19)6-10)8-21-14(24)12-2-1-5-22(12)17(16(21)26)7-13(23)20-15(17)25/h1-6H,7-8H2,(H,20,23,25)/t17-/m1/s1 Key: QCVNMNYRNIMDKV-QGZVFWFLBS
- SMILES: c1cc2n(c1)[C@@]3(CC(=O)NC3=O)C(=O)N(C2=O)Cc4ccc(cc4F)Br

Properties
Chemical formula	C_{17}H_{11}BrFN_{3}O_{4}
Molar mass	420.189 g/mol
- Except where otherwise noted, data are given for materials in their standard state (at 25 °C [77 °F], 100 kPa). verify (what is ?) Infobox references

Ranirestat (also known as AS-3201) is an aldose reductase inhibitor being developed for the treatment of diabetic neuropathy by Dainippon Sumitomo Pharma and PharmaKyorin. It has been granted orphan drug status. The drug is to be used orally.

== Trials ==
A Canadian Phase III clinical trial has been completed. Phase III trials in Europe and the US started in June 2009 and are expected to complete in April 2013.

== Mechanism of action ==
Ranirestat is aldose reductase inhibitor that acts by reducing sorbitol accumulation in cells. Aldose reductase is an enzyme that catalyzes one of the steps in sorbitol (polyol) pathway which is responsible for formation of fructose from glucose. Aldose reductase activity is increased, parallel to glucose blood levels, in tissues that are not insulin sensitive, including lenses, peripheral nerves and renal glomeruli. Sorbitol does not diffuse through cell membranes easily and therefore accumulates in these tissues, causing osmotic damage, leading to retinopathy and neuropathy.

== Efficacy ==
Results from a Canadian double-blind, placebo-controlled biopsy Phase III clinical trial, involving total of 549 patients with diabetic sensorimotor polyneuropathy (DSP) randomly assigned to treatment with placebo or 10, 20, or 40 mg/day ranirestat for 52 weeks, showed that ranirestat appears to have effect on motor nerve function in mild to moderate DSP, but failed to show statistically significant difference in sensory nerve function. Efficacy of ranirestat was evaluated by nerve conduction studies, the modified Toronto Clinical Neuropathy Score (mTCNS), and quantitative sensory tests (QSTs).

== See also ==
- Tolrestat, also an aldose reductase inhibitor, which was withdrawn from market in 1997 due to the risk of severe liver toxicity
