= Fidarestat =

Names
- Preferred IUPAC name (2S,4S)-6-Fluoro-2′,5′-dioxo-2,3-dihydrospiro[[1]benzopyran-4,4′-imidazolidine]-2-carboxamide
- Other names (2S,4S)-6-fluoro-2',5'-dioxospiro[chroman-4,4'-imidazolidine]-2-carboxamide

Identifiers
CAS Number	136087-85-9; 105300-43-4 (non specific)
3D model (JSmol)	Interactive image
ChEMBL	ChEMBL84446
ChemSpider	140679
KEGG	D01842
PubChem CID	160024
UNII	8SH8T1164U
CompTox Dashboard (EPA)	DTXSID4046654
- InChI: InChI=1S/C12H10FN3O4/c13-5-1-2-7-6(3-5)12(4-8(20-7)9(14)17)10(18)15-11(19)16-12/h1-3,8H,4H2,(H2,14,17)(H2,15,16,18,19)/t8-,12-/m0/s1 Key: WAAPEIZFCHNLKK-UFBFGSQYSA-N
- SMILES: c1cc2c(cc1F)[C@@]3(C[C@H](O2)C(=O)N)C(=O)NC(=O)N3

Properties
Chemical formula	C_{12}H_{10}FN_{3}O_{4}
Molar mass	279.227 g·mol^{−1}
Melting point	290–300 °C (554–572 °F; 563–573 K)
- Except where otherwise noted, data are given for materials in their standard state (at 25 °C [77 °F], 100 kPa). Infobox references

Fidarestat (SNK-860) is an aldose reductase inhibitor under investigation for treatment of diabetic neuropathy.
