= Exisulind =

Names
- Preferred IUPAC name [(1Z)-5-Fluoro-1-{[4-(methanesulfanyl)phenyl]methylidene}-2-methyl-1H-inden-3-yl]acetic acid
- Other names Sulindac sulfone, Aptosyn, FGN-1, Prevatac

Identifiers
CAS Number	59973-80-7
3D model (JSmol)	Interactive image
ChEBI	CHEBI:64212
ChEMBL	ChEMBL488025
ChemSpider	4582441
PubChem CID	5472495
UNII	K619IIG2R9
CompTox Dashboard (EPA)	DTXSID6040246
- InChI: InChI=1S/C20H17FO4S/c1-12-17(9-13-3-6-15(7-4-13)26(2,24)25)16-8-5-14(21)10-19(16)18(12)11-20(22)23/h3-10H,11H2,1-2H3,(H,22,23)/b17-9- Key: MVGSNCBCUWPVDA-MFOYZWKCSA-N; InChI=1/C20H17FO4S/c1-12-17(9-13-3-6-15(7-4-13)26(2,24)25)16-8-5-14(21)10-19(16)18(12)11-20(22)23/h3-10H,11H2,1-2H3,(H,22,23)/b17-9- Key: MVGSNCBCUWPVDA-MFOYZWKCBW
- SMILES: CC1=C(CC(O)=O)C2=C(C=CC(F)=C2)\C1=C/C1=CC=C(C=C1)S(C)(=O)=O

Properties
Chemical formula	C_{20}H_{17}FO_{4}S
Molar mass	372.41 g·mol^{−1}
- Except where otherwise noted, data are given for materials in their standard state (at 25 °C [77 °F], 100 kPa). Infobox references

Exisulind (tentative trade name Aptosyn) is an antineoplastic agent. It acts by inhibiting the enzyme cyclic guanosine monophosphate phosphodiesterase type 5 (EC 3.1.4.17). It is the sulfone derivative of sulindac, an NSAID. Unlike sulindac, it has known effects on prostaglandin synthesis. It was developed as the potential treatment of several conditions including familial adenomatous polyposis (FAP), precancerous sporadic colonic polyps, cervical dysplasia and the prevention of tumor recurrence in prostate and breast cancer. Exisulind inhibits the enzyme cGMP-PDE, overexpressed in precancerous and cancerous colorectal cells, and induces apoptosis in such cells with minimal effects on normal cells. This apoptotic effect is independent of COX-1 or COX-2 inhibition, p53, Bcl-2, or cell cycle arrest. Preclinical evidence suggests that exisulind also inhibits angiogenesis.

== See also ==
- Sulindac
