= Tolrestat =

Chemical compound

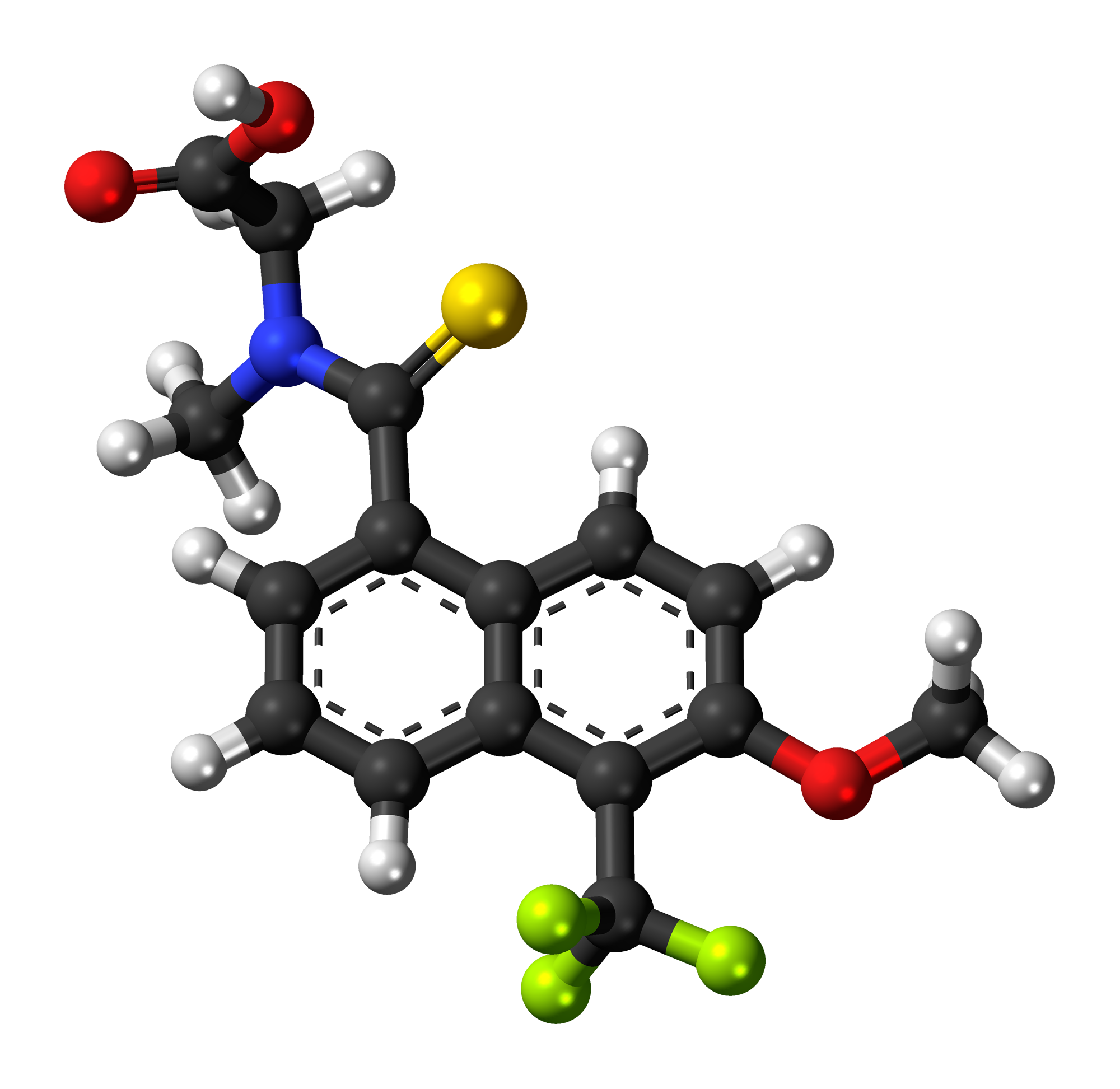

Clinical data
- ATC code: A10XA01 (WHO)

Legal status
- Legal status: Withdrawn from market

Identifiers
- IUPAC name: N-{[6-methoxy-5-(trifluoromethyl)-1-naphthyl]carbothioyl}-N-methylglycine
- CAS Number: 82964-04-3
- PubChem CID: 53359
- IUPHAR/BPS: 7404
- ChemSpider: 48194
- UNII: 0T93LG5NMK
- KEGG: D02323
- ChEMBL: ChEMBL436
- CompTox Dashboard (EPA): DTXSID80904890 DTXSID6048834, DTXSID80904890

Chemical and physical data
- Formula: C_{16}H_{14}F_{3}NO_{3}S
- Molar mass: 357.35 g·mol^{−1}
- 3D model (JSmol): Interactive image
- SMILES: CN(CC(=O)O)C(=S)C1=CC=CC2=C1C=CC(=C2C(F)(F)F)OC
- InChI: InChI=1S/C16H14F3NO3S/c1-20(8-13(21)22)15(24)11-5-3-4-10-9(11)6-7-12(23-2)14(10)16(17,18)19/h3-7H,8H2,1-2H3,(H,21,22); Key:LUBHDINQXIHVLS-UHFFFAOYSA-N

Tolrestat (INN; AY-27773) is an aldose reductase inhibitor which was approved for the control of certain diabetic complications.

While it was approved for marketed in several countries, it failed a Phase III trial in the U.S. due to toxicity and never received FDA approval. It was discontinued by Wyeth in 1997 because of the risk of severe liver toxicity and death. It was sold under the tradename Alredase.
