= Sorbitol =

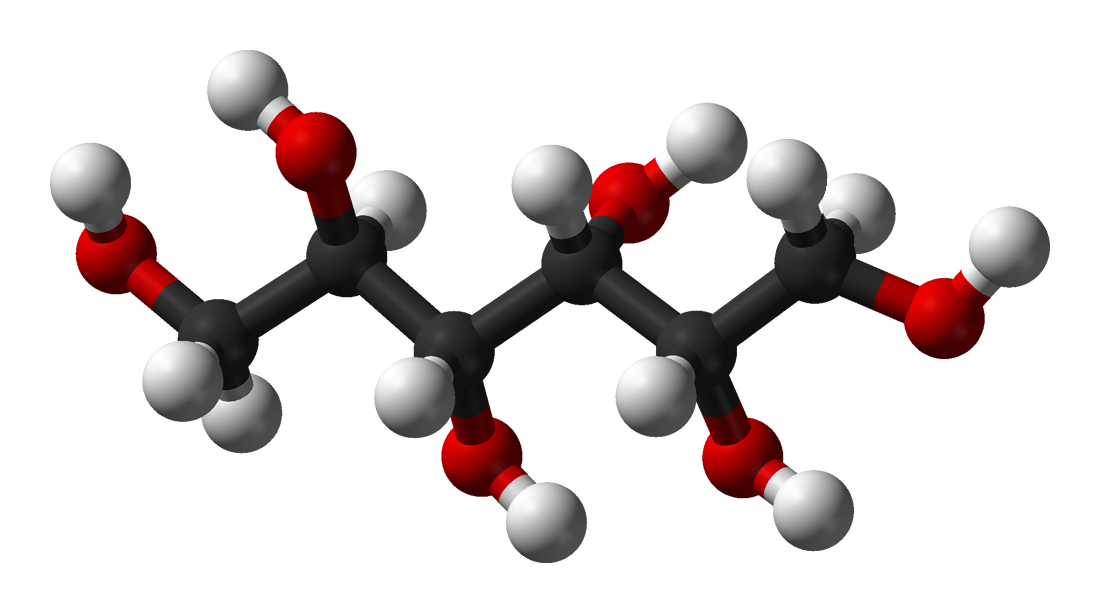

Names
- IUPAC name D-Glucitol
- Systematic IUPAC name (2S,3R,4R,5R)-Hexane-1,2,3,4,5,6-hexol
- Other names D-Sorbitol; Sorbogem; Sorbo

Identifiers
CAS Number	50-70-4
3D model (JSmol)	Interactive image
ChEBI	CHEBI:17924
ChEMBL	ChEMBL1682
ChemSpider	5576
DrugBank	DB01638
ECHA InfoCard	100.000.056
E number	E420 (thickeners, ...)
KEGG	C00794
MeSH	Sorbitol
PubChem CID	5780
UNII	506T60A25R
CompTox Dashboard (EPA)	DTXSID5023588
- InChI: InChI=1S/C6H14O6/c7-1-3(9)5(11)6(12)4(10)2-8/h3-12H,1-2H2/t3-,4+,5-,6-/m1/s1 Key: FBPFZTCFMRRESA-JGWLITMVSA-N; InChI=1/C6H14O6/c7-1-3(9)5(11)6(12)4(10)2-8/h3-12H,1-2H2/t3-,4+,5-,6-/m1/s1 Key: FBPFZTCFMRRESA-JGWLITMVSA
- SMILES: OC([C@H](O)[C@@H](O)[C@H](O)CO)CO

Properties
Chemical formula	C_{6}H_{14}O_{6}
Molar mass	182.17 g/mol
Appearance	White crystalline powder
Density	1.49 g/cm^{3}
Melting point	94–96 °C (201–205 °F; 367–369 K)
Solubility in water	2350 g/L (25 °C (77 °F))
log P	−3.1
Magnetic susceptibility (χ)	−107.80·10^{−6} cm^{3}/mol

Pharmacology
ATC code	A06AD18 (WHO) A06AG07 (WHO) B05CX02 (WHO) V04CC01 (WHO)

Hazards
NFPA 704 (fire diamond)	1 1 0
Flash point	> 100 °C (212 °F; 373 K)
Autoignition temperature	420 °C (788 °F; 693 K)
- Except where otherwise noted, data are given for materials in their standard state (at 25 °C [77 °F], 100 kPa). verify (what is ?) Infobox references

Sorbitol (/ˈsɔː(r)bɪtɒl/), less commonly known as glucitol (/ˈɡluːsɪtɒl/), is a sugar alcohol with a sweet taste which the human body metabolizes slowly. It can be obtained by reduction of glucose, which changes the converted aldehyde group (−CHO) to a primary alcohol group (−CH_{2}OH). Most sorbitol is made from potato starch, but it is also found in nature, such as in apples, other tree fruits, and berries.

It is converted to fructose by sorbitol-6-phosphate 2-dehydrogenase. Sorbitol is an isomer of mannitol, another sugar alcohol; the two differ only in the orientation of the hydroxyl group on carbon 2. While similar, the two sugar alcohols have different sources in nature, melting points, and uses.

As an over-the-counter drug, sorbitol is used as a laxative to treat constipation. It provides about half the sweetness of table sugar.

== Synthesis ==
Sorbitol may be synthesised via a glucose reduction reaction in which the converted aldehyde group is converted into a hydroxyl group. The reaction requires NADH and is catalyzed by aldose reductase. Glucose reduction is the first step of the polyol pathway of glucose metabolism, and is implicated in multiple diabetic complications.

C_{6}H_{12}O_{6} + NADH + H^{+} → C_{6}H_{14}O_{6} + NAD^{+}

The mechanism involves a tyrosine residue in the active site of aldehyde reductase. The hydrogen atom on NADH is transferred to the electrophilic aldehyde carbon atom; electrons on the aldehyde carbon-oxygen double bond are transferred to the oxygen that abstracts the proton on tyrosine side chain to form the hydroxyl group. The role of aldehyde reductase tyrosine phenol group is to serve as a general acid to provide proton to the reduced aldehyde oxygen on glucose.

== Uses ==
=== Sweetener ===
Sorbitol is a sugar substitute, and when used in food, it has the INS number and E number 420. Sorbitol is about 50% as sweet as sucrose (table sugar).

Sorbitol is referred to as a nutritive sweetener because it provides some dietary energy. It is partly absorbed from the small intestine and metabolized in the body, and partly fermented in the large intestine. The fermentation produces short-chain fatty acids, acetic acid, propionic acid, and butyric acid, which are mostly absorbed and provide energy, but also carbon dioxide, methane, and hydrogen which do not provide energy. Even though the heat of combustion of sorbitol is higher than that of glucose (having two extra hydrogen atoms), the net energy contribution is between 2.5 and 3.4 kilocalories per gram, versus the approximately 4 kilocalories (17 kilojoules) for carbohydrates. It is often used in diet foods (including diet drinks and ice cream), mints, cough syrups, and sugar-free chewing gum. Most bacteria cannot use sorbitol for energy, but it can be slowly fermented in the mouth by Streptococcus mutans, a bacterium that causes tooth decay. In contrast, many other sugar alcohols such as isomalt and xylitol are considered non-acidogenic.

It also occurs naturally in many stone fruits and berries from trees of the genus Sorbus.

=== Medical applications ===
==== Laxative ====
As is the case with other sugar alcohols, foods containing sorbitol can cause gastrointestinal distress. Sorbitol can be used as a laxative when taken orally or as an enema. Sorbitol works as a laxative by drawing water into the large intestine, stimulating bowel movements. Sorbitol has been determined safe for use by the elderly, although it is not recommended without the advice of a physician.

Sorbitol is commonly used orally as a one-time dose of 30–150 millilitres (1.1–5.3 imp fl oz; 1.0–5.1 US fl oz) 70% solution. It may also be used as a one-time rectal enema.

==== Other medical applications ====
Sorbitol is used in bacterial culture media to distinguish the pathogenic Escherichia coli O157:H7 from most other strains of E. coli, because it is usually unable to ferment sorbitol, unlike 93% of known E. coli strains.

A treatment for hyperkalaemia (elevated blood potassium) uses sorbitol and the ion-exchange resin sodium polystyrene sulfonate (tradename Kayexalate). The resin exchanges sodium ions for potassium ions in the bowel, while sorbitol helps to eliminate it. In 2010, the U.S. FDA issued a warning of increased risk for gastrointestinal necrosis with this combination.

Sorbitol is also used in the manufacture of softgel capsules to store single doses of liquid medicines.

=== Health care, food, and cosmetic uses ===
Sorbitol often is used in modern cosmetics as a humectant and thickener. It is also used in mouthwash and toothpaste. Some transparent gels can be made only with sorbitol, because of its high refractive index.

Sorbitol is used as a cryoprotectant additive (mixed with sucrose and sodium polyphosphates) in the manufacture of surimi, a processed fish paste. It is also used as a humectant in some cigarettes.

Beyond its use as a sugar substitute in reduced-sugar foods, sorbitol is also used as a humectant in cookies and low-moisture foods like peanut butter and fruit preserves. In baking, it acts as a plasticizer, and slows down the staling process.

=== Miscellaneous uses ===
A mixture of sorbitol and potassium nitrate has found some success as an amateur solid rocket fuel. It has similar performance to sucrose-based rocket candy, but is easier to cast, less hygroscopic and does not caramelize.

Sorbitol is identified as a potential key chemical intermediate for production of fuels from biomass resources. Carbohydrate fractions in biomass such as cellulose undergo sequential hydrolysis and hydrogenation in the presence of metal catalysts to produce sorbitol. Complete reduction of sorbitol opens the way to alkanes, such as hexane, which can be used as a biofuel. Hydrogen required for this reaction can be produced by aqueous phase catalytic reforming of sorbitol.

19 C_{6}H_{14}O_{6} → 13 C_{6}H_{14} + 36 CO_{2} + 42 H_{2}O

The above chemical reaction is exothermic, and 1.5 moles of sorbitol generate approximately 1 mole of hexane. When hydrogen is co-fed, no carbon dioxide is produced.

Sorbitol based polyols are used in the production of polyurethane foam for the construction industry.

It is also added after electroporation of yeasts in transformation protocols, allowing the cells to recover by raising the osmolarity of the medium.

== Potential adverse effects ==
Sorbitol may cause allergic reactions in some people. Common side effects from use as a laxative are stomach cramps, vomiting, diarrhea, or rectal bleeding.

== Compendial status ==
- Food Chemicals Codex
- European Pharmacopoeia 6.1
- British Pharmacopoeia 2009
- Japanese Pharmacopoeia 17

== See also ==
- Sorbitan
- Isosorbide
