= Galactolysis =

Metabolic process

Galactolysis refers to the catabolism of galactose.

Galactolysis is a metabolic process by which galactose is catabolized into glucose derivatives. This process primarily takes place in the liver, where galactose is converted through the Leloir Pathway into derivatives that subsequently enters the glycolysis pathway to be further broken down for energy production. Galactolysis is essential for metabolism of dietary galactose, which is commonly obtained from lactose in milk and diary products. Defects regarding this pathway can lead to a rare genetic disorder called galactosemia, which is a condition characterized by toxic accumulation of galactose.

== Pathway ==
Galactose is a six-carbon sugar (hexose) commonly ingested as lactose which will get hydrolyzed by the enzyme lactase into glucose and galactose. The galactose is then absorbed into the bloodstream where Galactolysis occurs.

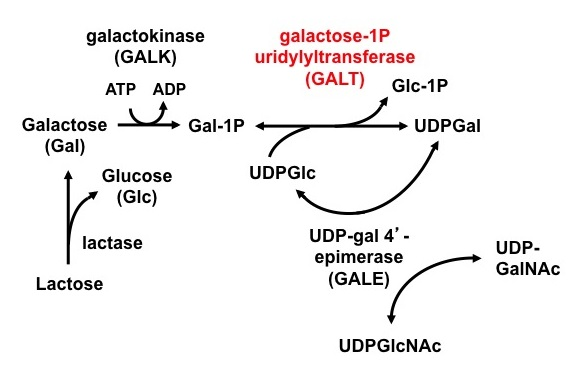
Leloir Pathway

The primary pathway of Galactolysis in humans is known as the Leloir pathway. This pathway was discovered by Luis Federico Leloir, who received a Nobel Prize in Chemistry in 1970. In the first step, the activated form α-D-galactose is phosphorylated by the enzyme galactokinase (GALK1) in order to form α-D-galactose-1-phosphate. Next, the enzyme galactose-1-phosphate uridylyl transferase (GALT) will facilitate the exchange of the phosphate group from galactose-1-phosphate with the UDP group from UDP-glucose, resulting in the formation of UDP-galactose and glucose-1-phosphate. UDP-galactose is then converted into UDP-glucose by changing the orientation of the hydroxyl group on the 4th carbon through epimerization. This helps replenish the UDP-glucose used in step 2. Finally, glucose-1-phosphate will be converted to glucose-6-phosphate by the enzyme phosphoglucomutase.

Disruptions in the Leloir pathway can lead to a rare inherited genetic disorder known as galactosemia. This condition is caused by the deficiencies in galactokinase, galactose-1-phosphate uridylyl UDP-glucose, and UDP-galactose-4-epimerase. This results in the toxic accumulation of galactose in the tissues

== Metabolic disorders ==
There are 3 types of galactosemia or galactose deficiencies:

Name	Enzyme	Description
Type I:Galactose-1-phosphate uridylyltransferase deficiency	Galactose-1-phosphate uridylyltransferase	Is the most problematic, as galactose-free diets are not effective in treating neurocognitive deficiencies (in particular language disorders such as verbal dyspraxia) and ovarian failure. If a galactose-free diet is administered, cataracts and acute symptoms such as kidney and liver failure respond immediately. Formation of cataracts is similar to that in galactokinase deficiency.
Type II:galactokinase deficiency	Galactokinase	Causes cataracts, which form due to the elevation of galactitol that accumulates when galactose is metabolized in an alternative pathway that is not the Leloir pathway. These are treatable by restricting galactose from the diet.
Type III:UDPgalactose-4-epimerase deficiency	UDPgalactose-4-epimerase	It is extremely rare (only 2 reported cases). It causes nerve deafness. Type III is categorized as a continuum disorder in three forms: generalized, intermediate, and peripheral. The difference between these three forms is the amount of enzyme activity in each tissue. In peripheral patients, they only have a red and white blood cell deficiency. Intermediate has a deficiency in some tissues but not completely. Generalized is the most severe form, where there is a deficiency of this enzyme in all tissues.

Most people suffering from galactosemia must make significant lifestyle adjustments and receive medical care. Firstly, most patients have to remove milk and dairy products to prevent the accumulation of galactose. In addition, many children with Type 1 may have speech delays, motor coordination, and learning disabilities. These often requires interventions such as speech therapy and special education support to aid the child in their development.
