= Galactokinase =

Enzyme

Galactokinase 1
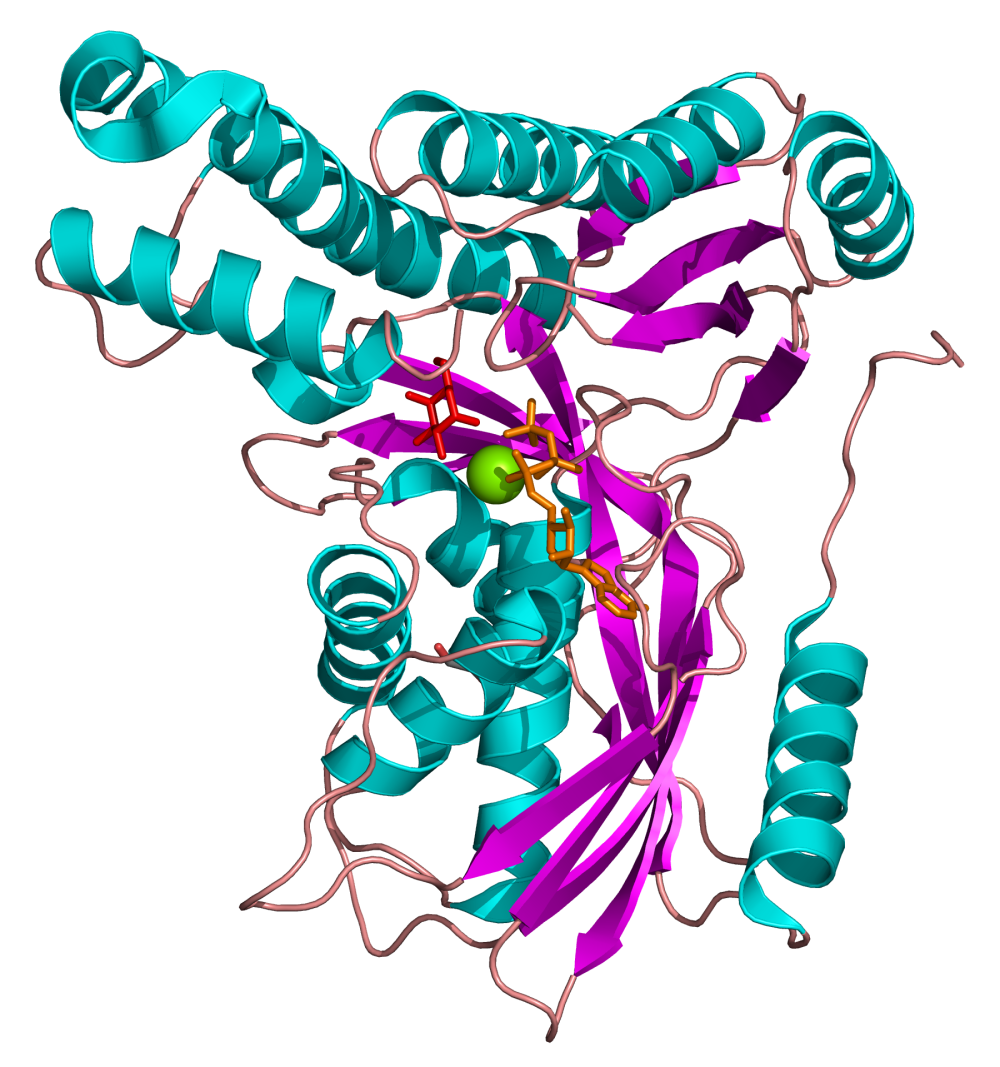
- Cartoon structure of a human galactokinase 1 monomer in complex with galactose (red) and an ATP analogue (orange). A magnesium ion is visible as a green sphere. (From PDB: 1WUU)

Identifiers
- Symbol: GALK1
- Alt. symbols: GALK
- NCBI gene: 2584
- HGNC: 4118
- OMIM: 604313
- RefSeq: NM_000154
- UniProt: P51570

Other data
- EC number: 2.7.1.6
- Locus: Chr. 17 q23-q25
Search for
- Structures: Swiss-model
- Domains: InterPro

Galactokinase 2

Identifiers
- Symbol: GALK2
- NCBI gene: 2585
- HGNC: 4119
- OMIM: 137028
- RefSeq: NM_002044
- UniProt: Q01415

Other data
- EC number: 2.7.1.6
- Locus: Chr. 15
Search for
- Structures: Swiss-model
- Domains: InterPro

Galactokinase is an enzyme (phosphotransferase) that facilitates the phosphorylation of α-D-galactose to galactose 1-phosphate at the expense of one molecule of ATP. Galactokinase catalyzes the second step of the Leloir pathway, a metabolic pathway found in most organisms for the catabolism of α-D-galactose to glucose 1-phosphate. First isolated from mammalian liver, galactokinase has been studied extensively in yeast, archaea, plants, and humans.

== Structure ==
Galactokinase is composed of two domains separated by a large cleft. The two regions are known as the N- and C-terminal domains, and the adenine ring of ATP binds in a hydrophobic pocket located at their interface. The N-terminal domain is marked by five strands of mixed beta-sheet and five alpha-helices, and the C-terminal domain is characterized by two layers of anti-parallel beta-sheets and six alpha-helices. Galactokinase does not belong to the sugar kinase family, but rather to a class of ATP-dependent enzymes known as the GHMP superfamily. GHMP is an abbreviation referring to its original members: galactokinase, homoserine kinase, mevalonate kinase, and phosphomevalonate kinase. Members of the GHMP superfamily have great three-dimensional similarity despite only ten to 20% sequence identity. These enzymes contain three well-conserved motifs (I, II, and III), the second of which is involved in nucleotide binding and has the sequence Pro-X-X-X-Gly-Leu-X-Ser-Ser-Ala.

=== Sugar specificity ===
Galactokinases across different species display a great diversity of substrate specificities. E. coli galactokinase can also phosphorylate 2-deoxy-D-galactose, 2-amino-deoxy-D-galactose, 3-deoxy-D-galactose and D-fucose. The enzyme cannot tolerate any C-4 modifications, but changes at the C-2 position of D-galactose do not interfere with enzyme function. Both human and rat galactokinases are also able to successfully phosphorylate 2-deoxy-D-galactose. Galactokinase from S. cerevisiae, on the other hand, is highly specific for D-galactose and cannot phosphorylate glucose, mannose, arabinose, fucose, lactose, galactitol, or 2-deoxy-D-galactose. Moreover, the kinetic properties of galactokinase also differ across species. The sugar specificity of galactokinases from different sources has been dramatically expanded through directed evolution and structure-based protein engineering. The corresponding broadly permissive sugar anomeric kinases serve as a cornerstone for in vitro and in vivo glycorandomization.

== Mechanism ==
Recently, the roles of active site residues in human galactokinase have become understood. Asp-186 abstracts a proton from C1-OH of α-D-galactose, and the resulting alkoxide nucleophile attacks the γ-phosphorus of ATP. A phosphate group is transferred to the sugar, and Asp-186 may be deprotonated by water. Nearby Arg-37 stabilizes Asp-186 in its anionic form and has also been proven to be essential to galactokinase function in point mutation experiments. Both the aspartic acid and arginine active site residues are highly conserved among galactokinases.

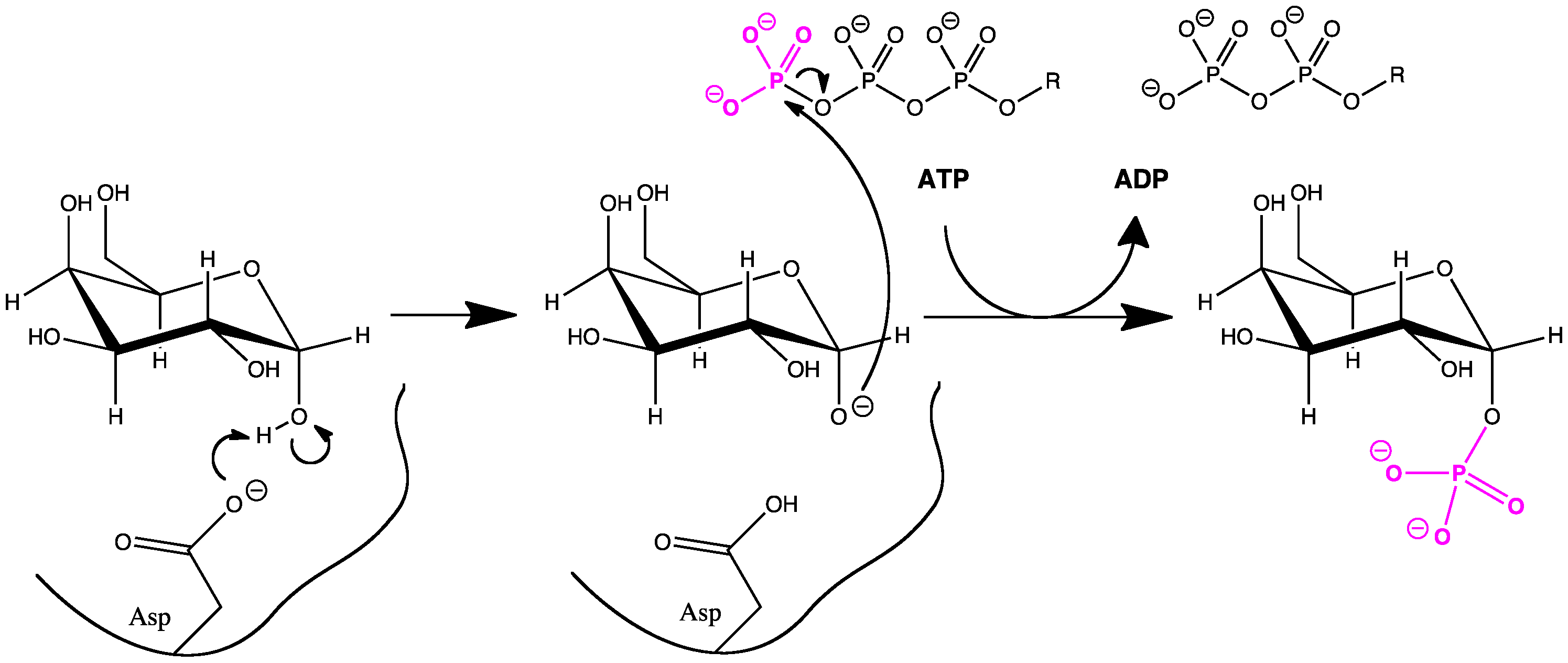
The likely galactokinase mechanism. The aspartate residue is stabilized in its anionic form by a nearby arginine residue.

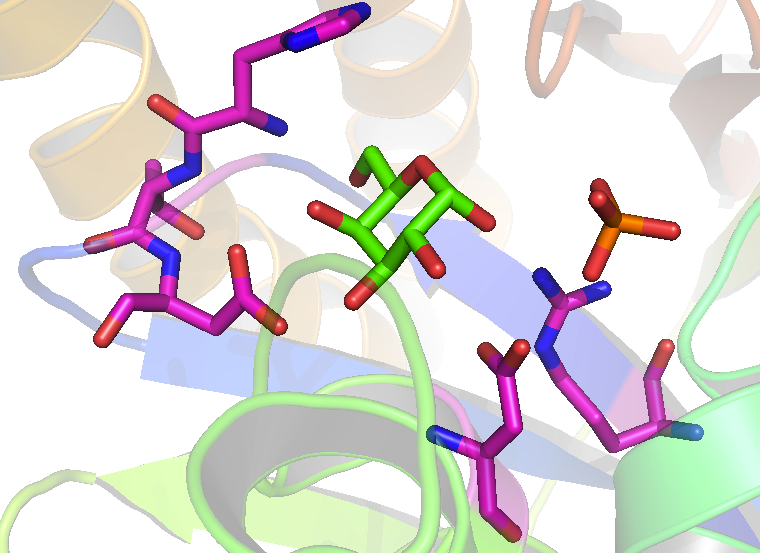
Crystal structure of galactokinase active site from Lactococcus lactis. Galactokinase is shown in green, phosphate in orange, and the residues responsible for binding the sugar ligand are shown in magenta: Arg-36, Glu-42, Asp-45, Asp-183, and Tyr-233. Arg-36 and Asp-183 of Lactococcus lactis galactokinase are analogous to Arg-37 and Asp-186 in human galactokinase. (From PDB: 1PIE)

== Biological function ==
The Leloir pathway catalyzes the conversion of galactose to glucose. Galactose is found in dairy products, as well as in fruits and vegetables, and can be produced endogenously in the breakdown of glycoproteins and glycolipids. Three enzymes are required in the Leloir pathway: galactokinase, galactose-1-phosphate uridylyltransferase, and UDP-galactose 4′-epimerase. Galactokinase catalyzes the first committed step of galactose catabolism, forming galactose 1-phosphate.

== Disease relevance ==
Galactosemia, a rare metabolic disorder characterized by decreased ability to metabolize galactose, can be caused by a mutation in any of the three enzymes in the Leloir pathway. Galactokinase deficiency, also known as galactosemia type II, is a recessive metabolic disorder caused by a mutation in human galactokinase. About 20 mutations have been identified that cause galactosemia type II, the main symptom of which is early onset cataracts. In lens cells of the human eye, aldose reductase converts galactose to galactitol. As galactose is not being catabolized to glucose due to a galactokinase mutation, galactitol accumulates. This galactitol gradient across the lens cell membrane triggers the osmotic uptake of water, and the swelling and eventual apoptosis of lens cells ensues.
