= C6H14O6 =

The molecular formula C_{6}H_{14}O_{6} (molar mass: 182.172 g/mol) may refer to:

- Galactitol, a sugar alcohol, the reduction product of galactose
- Iditol, a sugar alcohol which accumulates in galactokinase deficiency
- Mannitol, a sugar alcohol used as a sweetener and medication
- Sorbitol, a sugar alcohol with a sweet taste which the human body metabolizes slowly
