= Galactitol 2-dehydrogenase =

galactitol 2-dehydrogenase

Identifiers
- EC no.: 1.1.1.16
- CAS no.: 9028-23-3

Databases
- BRENDA: enzyme data
- ExPASy: NiceZyme view
- KEGG: enzyme entry
- MetaCyc: metabolic pathway
- Rhea: reactions
- PDB structures: RCSB PDB PDBe PDBsum
- Gene Ontology: AmiGO / QuickGO
Search
- PMC: articles
- PubMed: articles
- NCBI: proteins

Galactitol 2-dehydrogenases (EC 1.1.1.16) are a type of enzyme found in bacteria that catalyzes the chemical reaction

galactitol
+ NAD^{+}
H^{+}
H^{+}
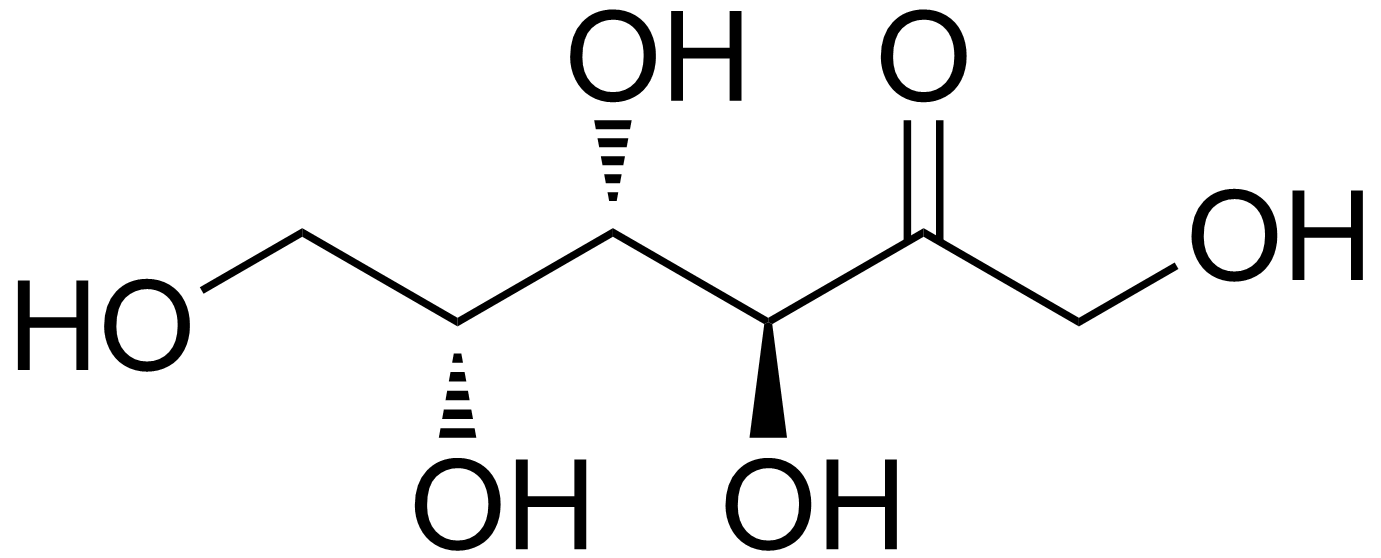
D-tagatose
+ NADH

The two substrates of this enzyme are galactitol and oxidised nicotinamide adenine dinucleotide (NAD^{+}). Its products are D-tagatose, reduced NADH, and a proton.

This enzyme belongs to the family of oxidoreductases, specifically those acting on the CH-OH group of donor with NAD^{+} or NADP^{+} as acceptor. The systematic name of this enzyme class is galactitol:NAD^{+} 2-oxidoreductase. This enzyme is also called dulcitol dehydrogenase. This enzyme participates in galactose metabolism.
