= 5-Diphosphomevalonic acid =

Names
- Preferred IUPAC name 3-Hydroxy-3-methyl-5-[(1,3,3-trihydroxy-1,3-dioxo-1λ^{5},3λ^{5}-diphosphoxan-1-yl)oxy]pentanoic acid

Identifiers
| CAS Number | 1492-08-6 |
| 3D model (JSmol) | Interactive image; Interactive image |
| ChemSpider | 501 |
| IUPHAR/BPS | 3055 |
| MeSH | 5-diphosphomevalonic+acid |
| PubChem CID | 516 |
| CompTox Dashboard (EPA) | DTXSID00859292 DTXSID90900964, DTXSID00859292 |
- InChI: InChI=1S/C6H14O10P2/c1-6(9,4-5(7)8)2-3-15-18(13,14)16-17(10,11)12/h9H,2-4H2,1H3,(H,7,8)(H,13,14)(H2,10,11,12) Key: SIGQQUBJQXSAMW-UHFFFAOYSA-N; InChI=1/C6H14O10P2/c1-6(9,4-5(7)8)2-3-15-18(13,14)16-17(10,11)12/h9H,2-4H2,1H3,(H,7,8)(H,13,14)(H2,10,11,12) Key: SIGQQUBJQXSAMW-UHFFFAOYAI
- SMILES: CC(CCOP(=O)(O)OP(=O)(O)O)(CC(=O)O)O; O=P(OP(=O)(O)O)(OCCC(O)(C)CC(=O)O)O

Properties
| Chemical formula | C_{6}H_{14}O_{10}P_{2} |
| Molar mass | 308.117 g/mol |
- Except where otherwise noted, data are given for materials in their standard state (at 25 °C [77 °F], 100 kPa). verify (what is ?) Infobox references

5-Diphosphomevalonic acid (or mevalonate-5-pyrophosphate, or 5-pyrophosphomevalonate) is an intermediate in the mevalonate pathway.

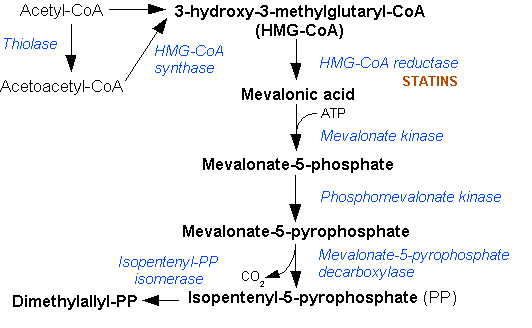
Mevalonate pathway

== See also ==
- Mevalonic acid
- Phosphomevalonate kinase
- Pyrophosphomevalonate decarboxylase
