= UDP-glucose 4-epimerase =

Class of enzymes

GALE

Identifiers
- Aliases: GALE, SDR1E1, UDP-galactose-4-epimerase
- External IDs: OMIM: 606953; MGI: 1921496; GeneCards: GALE
Available structures
PDB	Ortholog search: PDBe RCSB
PDB	List of PDB id codes 1I3N, 1EK5, 1I3K, 1EK6, 1I3L, 1HZJ, 1I3M
Enzyme activity
EC #	BRENDA	ExPASy	KEGG	MetaCyc
5.1.3.2	↗	↗	↗	↗
5.1.3.7	↗	↗	↗	↗

Gene location (Human)
Chr.	Chromosome 1 (human)
Band	1p36.11	Start	23,795,599 bp
Band	1p36.11	End	23,800,781 bp

Gene location (Mouse)
Chr.	Chromosome 4 (mouse)
Band	4|4 D3	Start	135,691,038 bp
Band	4|4 D3	End	135,695,489 bp
RNA expression pattern
Bgee	Human / Mouse (ortholog); Top expressed in: mucosa of transverse colon; rectum; right lobe of liver; minor salivary glands; olfactory zone of nasal mucosa; gallbladder; duodenum; body of stomach; jejunal mucosa; amniotic fluid / Top expressed in: duodenum; stomach; large intestine; gastric mucosa; pyloric antrum; colon; mucous cell of stomach; epithelium of stomach; facial skeleton; crypt of lieberkuhn of small intestine; More reference expression data
BioGPS	n/a
Gene ontology
Molecular function	racemase and epimerase activity, acting on carbohydrates and derivatives; UDP-N-acetylglucosamine 4-epimerase activity; isomerase activity; protein homodimerization activity; UDP-glucose 4-epimerase activity; identical protein binding
Cellular component	cytosol
Biological process	galactose metabolic process; galactose catabolic process; carbohydrate metabolic process; galactose catabolic process via UDP-galactose
Sources:Amigo / QuickGO
Orthologs
Databases	NCBI: entry; OMA: entry
Species	Human	Mouse
Entrez	2582	74246
Ensembl	ENSG00000117308	ENSMUSG00000028671
UniProt	Q14376	Q8R059
RefSeq (mRNA)	NM_001127621; NM_000403; NM_001008216	NM_178389; NM_001356493
RefSeq (protein)	NP_000394; NP_001008217; NP_001121093	NP_001343422
Location (UCSC)	Chr 1: 23.8 – 23.8 Mb	Chr 4: 135.69 – 135.7 Mb
PubMed search
- Wikidata
View/Edit Human	View/Edit Mouse

UDP-glucose 4-epimerase
- H. sapiens UDP-glucose 4-epimerase homodimer bound to NADH and UDP-glucose. Domains: N-terminal and C-terminal.

Identifiers
- EC no.: 5.1.3.2
- CAS no.: 9032-89-7

Databases
- BRENDA: enzyme data
- ExPASy: NiceZyme view
- KEGG: enzyme entry
- MetaCyc: metabolic pathway
- Rhea: reactions
- PDB structures: RCSB PDB PDBe PDBsum
- Gene Ontology: AmiGO / QuickGO
Search
- PMC: articles
- PubMed: articles
- NCBI: proteins

NAD-dependent epimerase/dehydratase

Identifiers
- Symbol: ?
- Pfam: PF01370
- InterPro: IPR001509
- Membranome: 330
Available protein structures:
- PDB: IPR001509 PF01370 (ECOD; PDBsum)
- AlphaFold: IPR001509; PF01370

Human GALE bound to NAD+ and UDP-GlcNAc, with N- and C-terminal domains highlighted. Asn 207 contorts to accommodate UDP-GlcNAc within the active site.

The enzyme UDP-glucose 4-epimerase (EC 5.1.3.2), also known as UDP-galactose 4-epimerase or GALE, is a homodimeric epimerase found in bacterial, fungal, plant, and mammalian cells. This enzyme performs the final step in the Leloir pathway of galactose metabolism, catalyzing the reversible conversion of UDP-galactose to UDP-glucose. GALE tightly binds nicotinamide adenine dinucleotide (NAD+), a co-factor required for catalytic activity.

Additionally, human and some bacterial GALE isoforms reversibly catalyze the formation of UDP-N-acetylgalactosamine (UDP-GalNAc) from UDP-N-acetylglucosamine (UDP-GlcNAc) in the presence of NAD+, an initial step in glycoprotein or glycolipid synthesis.

== Historical significance ==
Dr. Luis Leloir deduced the role of GALE in galactose metabolism during his tenure at the Instituto de Investigaciones Bioquímicas del Fundación Campomar, initially terming the enzyme waldenase. Dr. Leloir was awarded the 1970 Nobel Prize in Chemistry for his discovery of sugar nucleotides and their role in the biosynthesis of carbohydrates.

== Structure ==
GALE belongs to the short-chain dehydrogenase/reductase (SDR) superfamily of proteins. This family is characterized by a conserved Tyr-X-X-X-Lys motif necessary for enzymatic activity; one or more Rossmann fold scaffolds; and the ability to bind NAD^{+}.

=== Tertiary structure ===
GALE structure has been resolved for a number of species, including E. coli and humans. GALE exists as a homodimer in various species.

While subunit size varies from 68 amino acids (Enterococcus faecalis) to 564 amino acids (Rhodococcus jostii), a majority of GALE subunits cluster near 330 amino acids in length. Each subunit contains two distinct domains. An N-terminal domain contains a 7-stranded parallel β-pleated sheet flanked by α-helices. Paired Rossmann folds within this domain allow GALE to tightly bind one NAD^{+} cofactor per subunit. A 6-stranded β-sheet and 5 α-helices comprise GALE's C-terminal domain. C-terminal residues bind UDP, such that the subunit is responsible for correctly positioning UDP-glucose or UDP-galactose for catalysis.

=== Active site ===
The cleft between GALE's N- and C-terminal domains constitutes the enzyme's active site. A conserved Tyr-X-X-X Lys motif is necessary for GALE catalytic activity; in humans, this motif is represented by Tyr 157-Gly-Lys-Ser-Lys 161, while E. coli GALE contains Tyr 149-Gly-Lys-Ser-Lys 153. The size and shape of GALE's active site varies across species, allowing for variable GALE substrate specificity. Additionally, the conformation of the active site within a species-specific GALE is malleable; for instance, a bulky UDP-GlcNAc 2' N-acetyl group is accommodated within the human GALE active site by the rotation of the Asn 207 carboxamide side chain.

Known E. coli GALE residue interactions with UDP-glucose and UDP-galactose.
Residue	Function
Ala 216, Phe 218	Anchor uracil ring to enzyme.
Asp 295	Interacts with ribose 2' hydroxyl group.
Asn 179, Arg 231, Arg 292	Interact with UDP phosphate groups.
Tyr 299, Asn 179	Interact with galactose 2' hydroxyl or glucose 6' hydroxyl group; properly position sugar within active site.
Tyr 177, Phe 178	Interact with galactose 3' hydroxyl or glucose 6' hydroxyl group; properly position sugar within active site.
Lys 153	Lowers pKa of Tyr 149, allows for abstraction or donation of a hydrogen atom to or from the sugar 4' hydroxyl group.
Tyr 149	Abstracts or donates a hydrogen atom to or from the sugar 4' hydroxyl group, catalyzing formation of 4-ketopyranose intermediate.

== Mechanism ==
=== Conversion of UDP-galactose to UDP-glucose ===
GALE inverts the configuration of the 4' hydroxyl group of UDP-galactose through a series of 4 steps. Upon binding UDP-galactose, a conserved tyrosine residue in the active site abstracts a proton from the 4' hydroxyl group.

Concomitantly, the 4' hydride is added to the si-face of NAD+, generating NADH and a 4-ketopyranose intermediate. The 4-ketopyranose intermediate rotates 180° about the pyrophosphoryl linkage between the glycosyl oxygen and β-phosphorus atom, presenting the opposite face of the ketopyranose intermediate to NADH. Hydride transfer from NADH to this opposite face inverts the stereochemistry of the 4' center. The conserved tyrosine residue then donates its proton, regenerating the 4' hydroxyl group.

=== Conversion of UDP-GlcNAc to UDP-GalNAc ===
Human and some bacterial GALE isoforms reversibly catalyze the conversion of UDP-GlcNAc to UDP-GalNAc through an identical mechanism, inverting the stereochemical configuration at the sugar's 4' hydroxyl group.

== Biological function ==
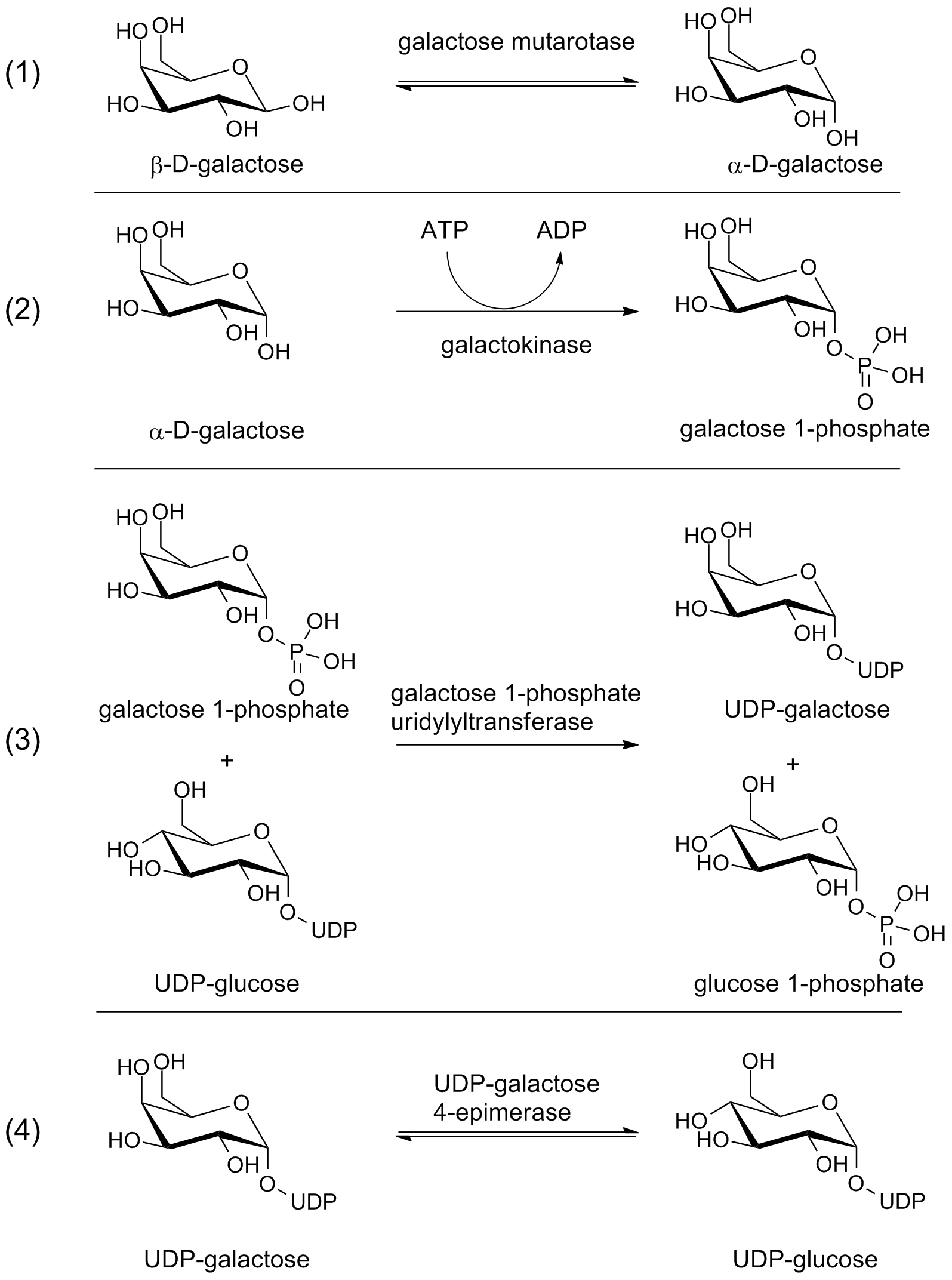
Intermediates and enzymes in the Leloir pathway of galactose metabolism.

=== Galactose metabolism ===
No direct catabolic pathways exist for galactose metabolism. Galactose is therefore preferentially converted into glucose-1-phosphate, which may be shunted into glycolysis or the inositol synthesis pathway.

GALE functions as one of four enzymes in the Leloir pathway of galactose conversion of glucose-1-phosphate. First, galactose mutarotase converts β-D-galactose to α-D-galactose. Galactokinase then phosphorylates α-D-galactose at the 1' hydroxyl group, yielding galactose-1-phosphate. In the third step, galactose-1-phosphate uridyltransferase catalyzes the reversible transfer of a UMP moiety from UDP-glucose to galactose-1-phosphate, generating UDP-galactose and glucose-1-phosphate. In the final Leloir step, UDP-glucose is regenerated from UDP-galactose by GALE; UDP-glucose cycles back to the third step of the pathway. As such, GALE regenerates a substrate necessary for continued Leloir pathway cycling.

The glucose-1-phosphate generated in step 3 of the Leloir pathway may be isomerized to glucose-6-phosphate by phosphoglucomutase. Glucose-6-phosphate readily enters glycolysis, leading to the production of ATP and pyruvate. Furthermore, glucose-6-phosphate may be converted to inositol-1-phosphate by inositol-3-phosphate synthase, generating a precursor needed for inositol biosynthesis.

=== UDP-GalNAc synthesis ===
Human and selected bacterial GALE isoforms bind UDP-GlcNAc, reversibly catalyzing its conversion to UDP-GalNAc. A family of glycosyltransferases known as UDP-N-acetylgalactosamine:polypeptide N-acetylgalactosamine transferases (ppGaNTases) transfers GalNAc from UDP-GalNAc to glycoprotein serine and threonine residues. ppGaNTase-mediated glycosylation regulates protein sorting, ligand signaling, resistance to proteolytic attack, and represents the first committed step in mucin biosynthesis.

== Role in disease ==
Human GALE deficiency or dysfunction results in Type III galactosemia, which may exist in a mild (peripheral) or more severe (generalized) form.
