= Sord =

Sord or SORD may refer to:

- Swords, County Dublin (Irish: Sord), a town in Ireland
- Sord Computer Corporation, a Japanese electronics company
- Sorbitol dehydrogenase, an enzyme encoded by the gene SORD
- L-iditol 2-dehydrogenase, an enzyme class sometimes called sorbitol dehydrogenase

== See also ==
- Sword (disambiguation)
- Sorde (disambiguation)
