= D-iditol 2-dehydrogenase =

d-iditol 2-dehydrogenase

Identifiers
- EC no.: 1.1.1.15
- CAS no.: 9028-22-2

Databases
- BRENDA: enzyme data
- ExPASy: NiceZyme view
- KEGG: enzyme entry
- MetaCyc: metabolic pathway
- Rhea: reactions
- PDB structures: RCSB PDB PDBe PDBsum
- Gene Ontology: AmiGO / QuickGO
Search
- PMC: articles
- PubMed: articles
- NCBI: proteins

d-Iditol 2-dehydrogenase (EC 1.1.1.15) is a type of enzyme that has been found in a species of yeast that catalyzes the chemical reaction

D-iditol
+ NAD^{+}
H^{+}
H^{+}
D-sorbose
+ NADH

The two substrates of this enzyme are D-iditol and oxidised nicotinamide adenine dinucleotide (NAD^{+}). Its products are D-sorbose, reduced NADH, and a proton.

This enzyme belongs to the family of oxidoreductases, specifically those acting on the CH-OH group of donor with NAD^{+} or NADP^{+} as acceptor. The systematic name of this enzyme class is d-iditol:NAD^{+} 2-oxidoreductase. This enzyme is also called d-sorbitol dehydrogenase. This enzyme participates in pentose and glucuronate interconversions and fructose and mannose metabolism.

== See also ==
- L-iditol 2-dehydrogenase
