= Galactokinase deficiency =

Hereditary metabolic disorder

- Other names: Galactosemia type 2 or GALK deficiency,
- Galactitol
- Specialty: Endocrinology

Galactokinase deficiency is an autosomal recessive metabolic disorder marked by an accumulation of galactose and galactitol secondary to the decreased conversion of galactose to galactose-1-phosphate by galactokinase. The disorder is caused by mutations in the GALK1 gene, located on chromosome 17q24. Galactokinase catalyzes the first step of galactose phosphorylation in the Leloir pathway of intermediate metabolism. Galactokinase deficiency is one of the three inborn errors of metabolism that lead to hypergalactosemia. The disorder is inherited as an autosomal recessive trait. Unlike classic galactosemia, which is caused by a deficiency of galactose-1-phosphate uridyltransferase, galactokinase deficiency does not present with severe manifestations in early infancy. Its major clinical symptom is the development of cataracts during the first weeks or months of life, as a result of the accumulation, in the lens, of galactitol, a product of an alternative route of galactose utilization. The development of early cataracts in homozygous affected infants is fully preventable through early diagnosis and treatment with a galactose-restricted diet. Some studies have suggested that, depending on milk consumption later in life, heterozygous carriers of galactokinase deficiency may be prone to presenile cataracts at 20–50 years of age.

Romani people have a high incidence of the disorder.

== Signs and symptoms ==
Causes the elevation of galactose in blood (galactosemia) and urine (galactosuria).

When the patient consumes galactose via their diet, it will result in galactitol accumulation. Which can result in cataracts.

== Genetics ==
Galactokinase deficiency has an autosomal recessive pattern of inheritance.

Galactokinase deficiency is an autosomal recessive disorder, which means the defective gene responsible for the disorder is located on an autosome (chromosome 17 is an autosome). Two copies of the defective gene (one inherited from each parent) are required in order to be born with the disorder. The parents of an individual with an autosomal recessive disorder both carry one copy of the defective gene, but usually do not experience any signs or symptoms of the disorder.

Unlike galactose-1-phosphate uridyltransferase deficiency, the symptoms of galactokinase deficiency are relatively mild. The only known symptom in affected children is the formation of cataracts, due to the production of galactitol in the lens of the eye. Cataracts can present as a failure to develop a social smile and a failure to visually track moving objects.

=== Gene structure ===
The human GALK1 gene contains 8 exons and spans approximately 7.3 kb of genomic DNA. The GALK1 promoter was found to have many features in common with other housekeeping genes, including high GC content, several copies of the binding site for the Sp1 transcription factor and the absence of TATA-box and CCAAT-box motifs typically present in eukaryotic polymerase II promoters. Analysis by 5-prime-RACE PCR indicated that the GALK1 mRNA is heterogeneous at the 5-prime end, with transcription sites occurring at many locations between 21 and 61 bp upstream of the ATG start site of the coding region. In vitro translation experiments of the GALK1 cDNA indicated that the protein is cytosolic and not associated with the endoplasmic reticulum membrane.

== Diagnosis ==
Diagnosis is established by high blood levels of galactose, normal activity of the enzyme galactose-1-phosphate uridyltransferase and reduced or no activity of galactokinase in RBCs.

== Treatment ==
Medical care

- Treatment may be provided on an outpatient basis.
- Cataracts that do not regress or disappear with therapy may require hospitalization for surgical removal.

Surgical care

- Cataracts may require surgical removal.

Consultations

- Biochemical geneticist
- Nutritionist
- Ophthalmologist

Diet

- Diet is the foundation of therapy. Elimination of lactose and galactose sources suffices for definitive therapy.

Activity

- No restriction is necessary.

== See also ==
- Galactosemia
