= Sorde =

Sorde may refer to:

- Sorde-l'Abbaye, a commune in France
- Sorde, Manipur, a village in India

== See also ==
- Sord (disambiguation)
