= Diphosphomevalonate decarboxylase =

InterPro Family

diphosphomevalonate decarboxylase
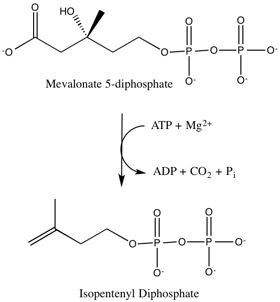
- ATP dependent decarboxylation catalyzed by mevalonate diphosphate decarboxylase

Identifiers
- EC no.: 4.1.1.33
- CAS no.: 9024-66-2

Databases
- BRENDA: enzyme data
- ExPASy: NiceZyme view
- KEGG: enzyme entry
- MetaCyc: metabolic pathway
- Rhea: reactions
- PDB structures: RCSB PDB PDBe PDBsum
- Gene Ontology: AmiGO / QuickGO
Search
- PMC: articles
- PubMed: articles
- NCBI: proteins

Mevalonate (diphospho) decarboxylase

Identifiers
- Symbol: MVD
- NCBI gene: 4597
- HGNC: 7529
- OMIM: 603236
- RefSeq: NM_002461
- UniProt: P53602

Other data
- EC number: 4.1.1.33
- Locus: Chr. 16 q24.3
Search for
- Structures: Swiss-model
- Domains: InterPro

Diphosphomevalonate decarboxylase (EC 4.1.1.33), most commonly referred to in scientific literature as mevalonate diphosphate decarboxylase, is an enzyme that catalyzes the chemical reaction

ATP + (R)-5-diphosphomevalonate $\rightleftharpoons$ ADP + phosphate + isopentenyl diphosphate + CO_{2}

This enzyme converts mevalonate 5-diphosphate (MVAPP) to isopentenyl diphosphate (IPP) through ATP dependent decarboxylation. The two substrates of this enzyme are ATP and mevalonate 5-diphosphate, whereas its 4 products are ADP, phosphate, isopentenyl diphosphate, and CO_{2}.

Mevalonate diphosphate decarboxylase catalyzes the final step in the mevalonate pathway. The mevalonate pathway is responsible for the biosynthesis of isoprenoids from acetate. This pathway plays a key role in multiple cellular processes by synthesizing sterol isoprenoids, such as cholesterol, and non-sterol isoprenoids, such as dolichol, heme A, tRNA isopentenyltransferase, and ubiquinone.

This enzyme belongs to the family of lyases, specifically the carboxy-lyases, which cleave carbon-carbon bonds.

== Nomenclature ==
The systematic name of this enzyme class is ATP:(R)-5-diphosphomevalonate carboxy-lyase (adding ATP isopentenyl-diphosphate-forming). Other names in common use include:

- pyrophosphomevalonate decarboxylase,
- mevalonate-5-pyrophosphate decarboxylase,
- pyrophosphomevalonic acid decarboxylase,
- 5-pyrophosphomevalonate decarboxylase,
- mevalonate 5-diphosphate decarboxylase, and
- ATP:(R)-5-diphosphomevalonate carboxy-lyase (dehydrating).

== Enzyme mechanism ==
Mevalonate diphosphate decarboxylase recognizes and binds two substrates: ATP and mevalonate 5-diphosphate. After binding, the enzyme performs three types of reactions that can be separated into two main stages. First, phosphorylation occurs. This creates a reactive intermediate, which in the second stage undergoes concerted dephosphorylation and decarboxylation. Many enzyme residues in the active site play important roles in this concerted mechanism. An aspartic acid residue deprotonates the C3 hydroxyl on MVAPP and facilitates the oxygen to attack a phosphate from ATP. As a result, intermediate 1, 3-phosphoMVAPP, now has a much better leaving group, which helps to produce intermediate 2. This third intermediate is a transient beta carboxy carbonium intermediate and provides an "electron sink" that helps drives the decarboxylation reaction.

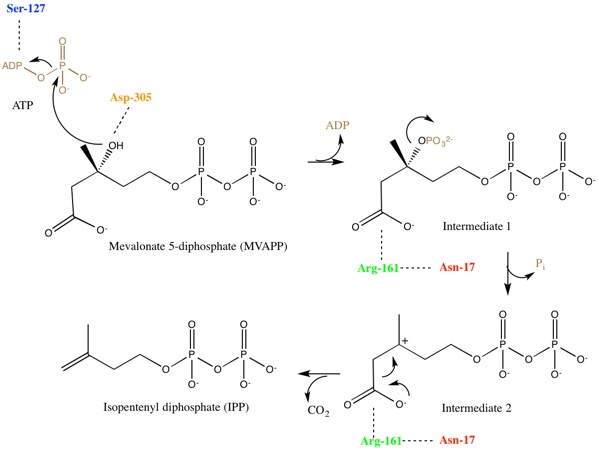
Proposed mechanism for human mevalonate diphosphate decarboxylase. Amino acid residues colored to correspond to crystal structure image of active site residues. ATP is brown to show phosphoryl transfer.

== Enzyme structure ==
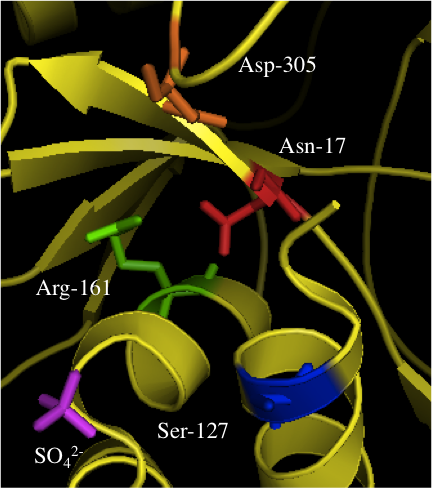
Crystal structure of the active cite of human mevalonate diphosphate decarboxylase, generated from 3D4J. Proposed important residues for mechanism and substrate binding are highlighted: Arg-161 (green), Ser-127 (blue), Asp-305 (orange), and Asn-17 (red). Sulfate ion aided in better understanding the substrate binding. Mevalonate diphosphate is proposed to be positioned so the terminal phosphate is near the sulfate ion in the crystal structure.

The exact enzyme apparatus of mevalonate diphosphate decarboxylase is not completely understood. Structures of both the yeast and human mevalonate diphosphate decarboxylase have been solved with X-ray crystallography, but scientists have experienced difficulties in obtaining structures of bound metabolites. Scientists have classified mevalonate diphosphate decarboxylase as an enzyme in the GHMP kinase family (galactokinase, homoserine kinase, mevalonate kinase, and phosphomevalonate kinase). Both mevalonate kinase and mevalonate diphosphate decarboxylase probably evolved from a common ancestor since they have a similar fold and catalyze phosphorylation of similar substrates. Due to these commonalities, both enzymes are often studied comparatively, and especially in reference to inhibitors.

Though there is limited information, some important residues have been identified and are highlighted in the active site structure and mechanism. Due to the difficulty of obtaining crystal structures of bound substrates, a sulfate ion and water molecules were used to better understand the residues role in substrate binding.

When investigating the human form of mevalonate diphosphate decarboxylase, the following specific residues were identified: arginine-161 (Arg-161), serine-127 (Ser-127), aspartate-305 (Asp-305), and asparagine-17 (Asn-17). Arg-161 interacts with the C1 carbonyl of MVAPP, and Asn-17 is important for hydrogen bonding with this same arginine residue. Asp-305 is positioned about 4 Å from the C3 hydroxyl on MVAPP and acts as a general base catalyst in the active site. Ser-127 aids in orientation of the phosphoryl chain for the phosphate transfer to MVAPP. Mevalonate diphosphate decarboxylase also has a phosphate-binding loop (‘P-loop’) where amino acid residues provide key interactions that stabilize the nucleotide triphosphoryl moiety. The residues from the P-loop are conserved across enzymes in the GHMP kinase family and include Ala-105, Ser-106, Ser-107 and Ala-108.

== Biological function ==
Many different organisms utilize the mevalonate pathway and mevalonate diphosphate decarboxylase, but for different purposes. In gram positive bacteria, isopentenyl diphosphate, the end product of mevalonate diphosphate decarboxylase, is an essential intermediate in peptidoglycan and polyisoprenoid biosynethesis. Therefore, targeting the mevalonate pathway, and mevalonate diphosphate decarboxylase, could be a potential antimicrobial drug.

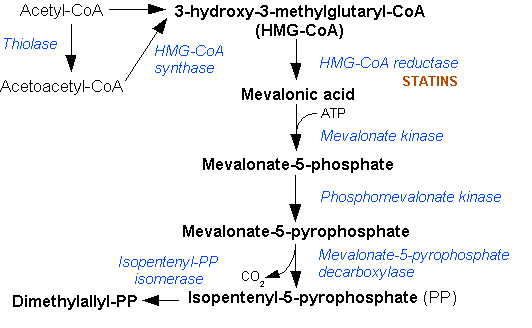
Mevalonate pathway

The mevalonate pathway is also used in higher order eukaryotes and plants. Mevalonate diphosphate decarboxylase is mainly present in the liver of mammals where the majority of mevalonate is converted to cholesterol. Some of the cholesterol is converted to steroid hormones, bile acids, and vitamin D. Mevalonate is also converted into many other important intermediates in mammalian cells: dolichols (carriers in the assembly of carbohydrate chains in glycoproteins), ubiquinones (important for electron transport), tRNA isopentenyltransferase (used in protein synthesis), and franesylated and geranylgeranylated proteins (membrane associated proteins that appear to be involved in intracellular signaling). The main point of regulation in cholesterol and nonsterol isoprene biosynethsis is HMGCoA reductase, the third enzyme in the mevalonate pathway.

== Disease relevance ==
Coronary artery disease is the leading cause of death in the US general population. Hypercholesterolemia or high cholesterol is considered a major risk factor in coronary artery disease. Therefore, major efforts are focused toward understanding regulation and developing inhibitors of cholesterol biosynthesis. Mevalonate diphosphate decarboxylase is a potential enzyme to be targeted in the cholesterol synthesis pathway. Scientists discovered a molecule, 6-fluoromevalonate (6-FMVA), to be a strong competitive inhibitor of mevalonate diphosphate decarboxylase. The addition of 6-FMVA results in a decrease in cholesterol levels.

Spontaneously hypertensive rats (stroke-prone) (SHRSP) are affected by severe hypertension and cerebral hemorrhage. Scientists have found a low serum cholesterol level in rats with this condition. In SHRSP, mevalonate diphosphate decarboxylase has a much lower activity while HMG-CoA reductase remains unchanged; therefore, mevalonate diphosphate decarboxylase may be responsible for the lower cholesterol biosynthesis in this condition. In humans, it is hypothesized that cholesterol deficiency may make the plasma membranes fragile and, as a result, induce angionecrosis in the brain. Reduced serum cholesterol, resulting from a low activity of mevalonate diphosphate decarboxylase, may be the cause of cerebral hemorrhage in some cases.

== Structural studies ==
As of 2015, at least 15 structures have been solved for this class of enzymes, including PDB accession codes PDB: 1FI4, PDB: 2HK2, PDB: 2HK3, and PDB: 2HKE.
