= GHMP kinase family =

GHMP kinases N terminal domain
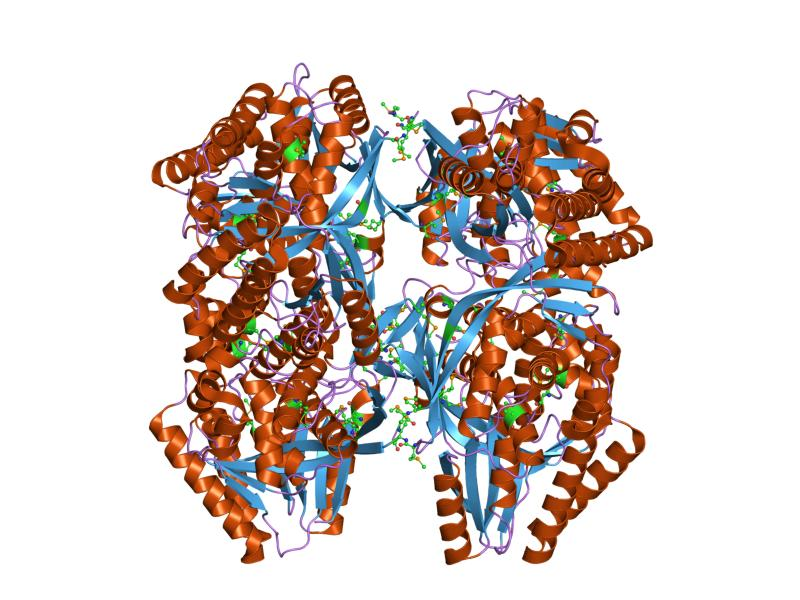
- crystal structure of the streptococcus pneumoniae phosphomevalonate kinase (pmk)

Identifiers
- Symbol: GHMP_kinases_N
- Pfam: PF00288
- Pfam clan: CL0329
- InterPro: IPR006204
- PROSITE: PDOC00545
- SCOP2: 1fwl / SCOPe / SUPFAM
Available protein structures:
- Pfam: structures / ECOD
- PDB: RCSB PDB; PDBe; PDBj
- PDBsum: structure summary

GHMP kinases C terminal
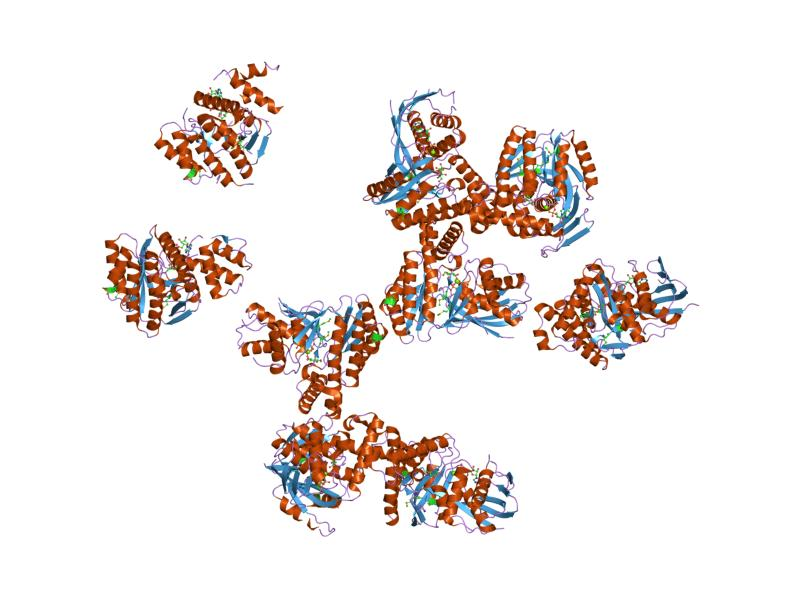
- pyrococcus furiosus galactokinase in complex with galactose, adp and magnesium

Identifiers
- Symbol: GHMP_kinases_C
- Pfam: PF08544
- InterPro: IPR013750
- PROSITE: PDOC00545
- SCOP2: 1fwl / SCOPe / SUPFAM
Available protein structures:
- Pfam: structures / ECOD
- PDB: RCSB PDB; PDBe; PDBj
- PDBsum: structure summary

In molecular biology, the GHMP kinase family is a family of kinase enzymes. Members of this family include homoserine kinases EC 2.7.1.39, galactokinases EC 2.7.1.6, and mevalonate kinasesEC 2.7.1.36. These kinases make up the GHMP kinase superfamily of ATP-dependent enzymes. These enzymes are involved in the biosynthesis of isoprenes and amino acids as well as in carbohydrate metabolism. These enzymes contain, in their N-terminal section, a conserved Gly/Ser-rich region which is probably involved in the binding of ATP. The C-terminal domain of homoserine kinase has a central alpha-beta plait fold and an insertion of four helices, which, together with the N-terminal fold, creates a novel nucleotide binding fold.
