= L-iditol 2-dehydrogenase =

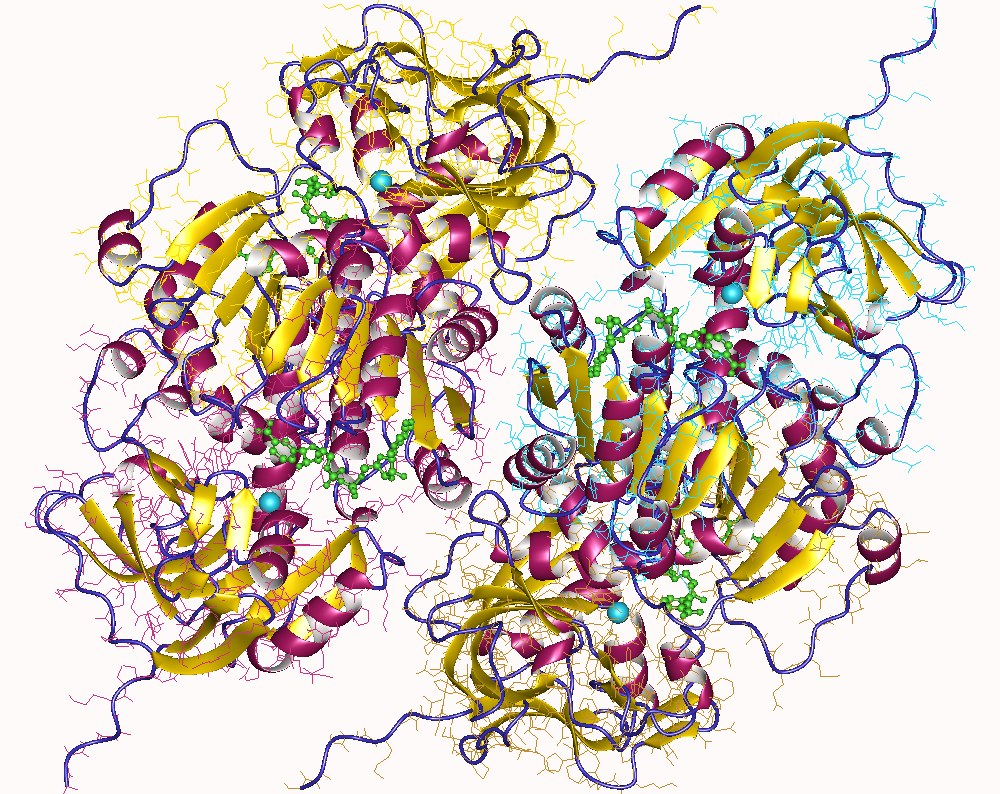
- Sorbitol dehydrogenase tetramer, Human

Identifiers
- EC no.: 1.1.1.14
- CAS no.: 9028-21-1

Databases
- BRENDA: enzyme data
- ExPASy: NiceZyme view
- KEGG: enzyme entry
- MetaCyc: metabolic pathway
- Rhea: reactions
- PDB structures: RCSB PDB PDBe PDBsum
- Gene Ontology: AmiGO / QuickGO
Search
- PMC: articles
- PubMed: articles
- NCBI: proteins

L-iditol 2-dehydrogenases (EC 1.1.1.14), also called sorbitol dehydrogenases, are a type of enzyme that catalyzes the chemical reaction

L-iditol
+ NAD^{+}
H^{+}
H^{+}
L-sorbose
+ NADH

The two substrates of this enzyme are L-iditol and oxidised nicotinamide adenine dinucleotide (NAD^{+}). Its products are L-sorbose, reduced NADH, and a proton.

This enzyme belongs to the family of oxidoreductases, specifically those acting on the CH-OH group of donor with NAD^{+} or NADP^{+} as acceptor. The systematic name of this enzyme class is L-iditol:NAD^{+} 2-oxidoreductase. Other names in common use include polyol dehydrogenase, sorbitol dehydrogenase, L-iditol:NAD^{+} 5-oxidoreductase, L-iditol (sorbitol) dehydrogenase, glucitol dehydrogenase, L-iditol:NAD^{+} oxidoreductase, NAD^{+}-dependent sorbitol dehydrogenase, NAD^{+}-dependent sorbitol dehydrogenase, and NAD^{+}-sorbitol dehydrogenase. This enzyme participates in fructose and mannose metabolism.

== Structural studies ==
As of late 2007, 4 structures have been solved for this class of enzymes, with PDB accession codes PDB: 1K2W, PDB: 1PL6, PDB: 1PL7, and PDB: 1PL8.

== See also ==
- D-iditol 2-dehydrogenase
