= Galactose 1-phosphate =

Names
- IUPAC name α-D-Galactopyranosyl dihydrogen phosphate
- Systematic IUPAC name (2R,3R,4S,5R,6R)-3,4,5-Trihydroxy-6-(hydroxymethyl)oxan-2-yl dihydrogen phosphate

Identifiers
CAS Number	2255-14-3
3D model (JSmol)	Interactive image
ChemSpider	110443
MeSH	Galactose-1-phosphate
PubChem CID	123912
UNII	4Z9Z6N3GH4
CompTox Dashboard (EPA)	DTXSID80177082
- InChI: InChI=1S/C6H13O9P/c7-1-2-3(8)4(9)5(10)6(14-2)15-16(11,12)13/h2-10H,1H2,(H2,11,12,13)/t2-,3+,4+,5-,6-/m1/s1 Key: HXXFSFRBOHSIMQ-FPRJBGLDSA-N; InChI=1/C6H13O9P/c7-1-2-3(8)4(9)5(10)6(14-2)15-16(11,12)13/h2-10H,1H2,(H2,11,12,13)/t2-,3+,4+,5-,6-/m1/s1 Key: HXXFSFRBOHSIMQ-FPRJBGLDBJ
- SMILES: O=P(O)(O[C@H]1O[C@@H]([C@H](O)[C@H](O)[C@H]1O)CO)O

Properties
Chemical formula	C_{6}H_{13}O_{9}P
Molar mass	260.135 g·mol^{−1}
- Except where otherwise noted, data are given for materials in their standard state (at 25 °C [77 °F], 100 kPa). verify (what is ?) Infobox references

D-Galactose-1-phosphate is an intermediate in the intraconversion of glucose and uridine diphosphate galactose. It is formed from galactose by galactokinase.The improper metabolism of galactose-1-phosphate is a characteristic of galactosemia. The Leloir pathway is responsible for such metabolism of galactose and its intermediate, galactose-1-phosphate. Deficiency of enzymes found in this pathway can result in galactosemia; therefore, diagnosis of this genetic disorder occasionally involves measuring the concentration of these enzymes. One of such enzymes is galactose-1-phosphate uridylyltransferase (GALT). The enzyme catalyzes the transfer of a UDP-activator group from UDP-glucose to galactose-1-phosphate. Although the cause of enzyme deficiency in the Leloir pathway is still disputed amongst researchers, some studies suggest that protein misfolding of GALT, which may lead to an unfavorable conformational change that impacts its thermal stability and substrate-binding affinity, may play a role in the deficiency of GALT in Type 1 galactosemia. Increase in galactitol concentration can be seen in patients with galactosemia; putting patients at higher risk for presenile cataract.

== See also ==
- Galactose-1-phosphate uridylyltransferase
