= Iditol =

d-Iditol
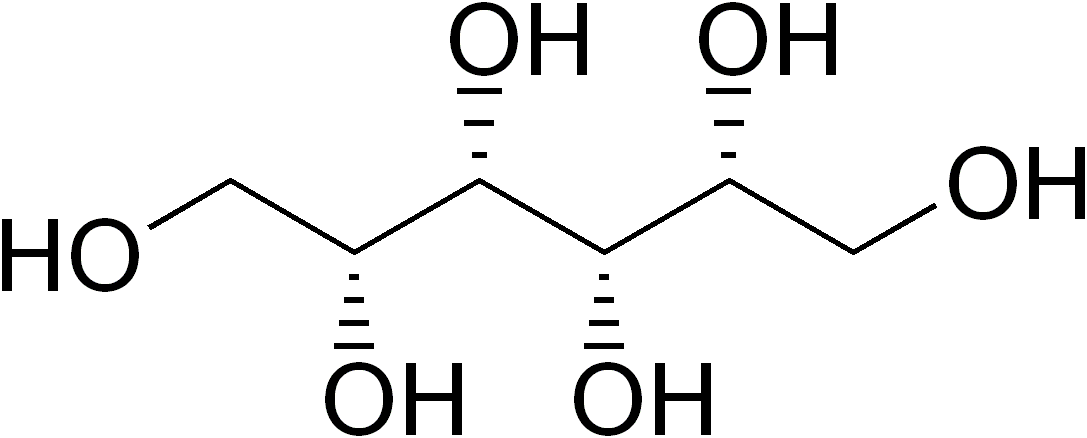

Names
- IUPAC name d-Iditol
- Systematic IUPAC name (2R,3S,4S,5R)-Hexane-1,2,3,4,5,6-hexol

Identifiers
CAS Number	25878-23-3; DL: 24557-79-7
3D model (JSmol)	Interactive image
Beilstein Reference	1721905
ChEBI	CHEBI:17459
ChemSpider	81747
ECHA InfoCard	100.125.135
EC Number	246-314-3
KEGG	C01489
PubChem CID	90540
UNII	82FOM4R7CD
CompTox Dashboard (EPA)	DTXSID401336595
- InChI: InChI=1S/C6H14O6/c7-1-3(9)5(11)6(12)4(10)2-8/h3-12H,1-2H2/t3-,4-,5+,6+/m1/s1 Key: FBPFZTCFMRRESA-ZXXMMSQZSA-N; InChI=1/C6H14O6/c7-1-3(9)5(11)6(12)4(10)2-8/h3-12H,1-2H2/t3-,4-,5+,6+/m1/s1 Key: FBPFZTCFMRRESA-ZXXMMSQZBT
- SMILES: O[C@@H]([C@H](O)CO)[C@@H](O)[C@H](O)CO

Properties
Chemical formula	C_{6}H_{14}O_{6}
Molar mass	182.172 g·mol^{−1}
- Except where otherwise noted, data are given for materials in their standard state (at 25 °C [77 °F], 100 kPa). verify (what is ?) Infobox references

Iditol is a sugar alcohol which accumulates in galactokinase deficiency.

It can be produced from sorbose by the action of the methanol yeast Candida boidinii at a conversion rate upwards of 90%.

== See also ==
- Idose
- Aldose reductase
- L-iditol 2-dehydrogenase
