= Galactitol =

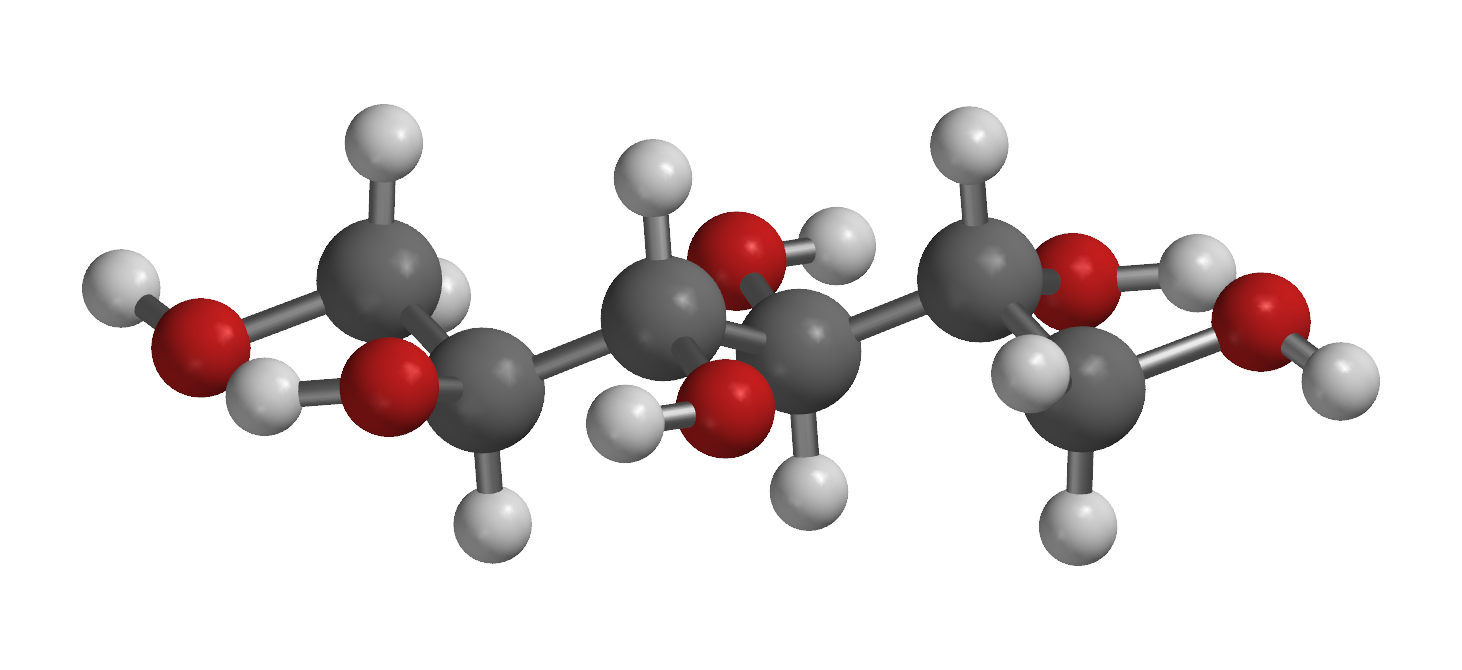

Names
- IUPAC name D-Galactitol
- Systematic IUPAC name (2R,3S,4R,5S)-hexane-1,2,3,4,5,6-hexol
- Other names Dulcitol

Identifiers
CAS Number	608-66-2
3D model (JSmol)	Interactive image
ChEBI	CHEBI:16813
ChEMBL	ChEMBL1773904
ChemSpider	11357
ECHA InfoCard	100.009.242
PubChem CID	11850
UNII	113ZQ1Y7DD
CompTox Dashboard (EPA)	DTXSID1046051
- InChI: InChI=1S/C6H14O6/c7-1-3(9)5(11)6(12)4(10)2-8/h3-12H,1-2H2/t3-,4+,5+,6- Key: FBPFZTCFMRRESA-GUCUJZIJSA-N; InChI=1/C6H14O6/c7-1-3(9)5(11)6(12)4(10)2-8/h3-12H,1-2H2/t3-,4+,5+,6- Key: FBPFZTCFMRRESA-GUCUJZIJBM
- SMILES: O[C@H]([C@@H](O)CO)[C@@H](O)[C@H](O)CO

Properties
Chemical formula	C_{6}H_{14}O_{6}
Molar mass	182.172 g/mol
Magnetic susceptibility (χ)	−112.40·10^{−6} cm^{3}/mol
- Except where otherwise noted, data are given for materials in their standard state (at 25 °C [77 °F], 100 kPa). verify (what is ?) Infobox references

Galactitol (dulcitol) is a sugar alcohol, the reduction product of galactose. It has a slightly sweet taste. In people with galactokinase deficiency, a form of galactosemia, excess dulcitol forms in the lens of the eye leading to cataracts.

Galactitol is produced from galactose in a reaction catalyzed by aldose reductase.

The other common galactose metabolism defect is a defect in galactose-1-phosphate uridylyltransferase, an autosomal recessive disorder, which also causes a buildup of galactitol as a result of increased concentrations of galactose-1-phosphate and galactose. This disorder leads to cataracts caused by galactitol buildup.
