= Phosphomevalonate kinase =

Protein found in humans

PMVK

Identifiers
- Aliases: PMVK, HUMPMKI, PMK, PMKA, PMKASE, POROK1, phosphomevalonate kinase
- External IDs: OMIM: 607622; MGI: 1915853; GeneCards: PMVK
Available structures
PDB	Ortholog search: PDBe RCSB
PDB	List of PDB id codes 3CH4
Enzyme activity
EC #	BRENDA	ExPASy	KEGG	MetaCyc
2.7.4.2	↗	↗	↗	↗

Gene location (Human)
Chr.	Chromosome 1 (human)
Band	1q21.3	Start	154,924,740 bp
Band	1q21.3	End	154,936,719 bp

Gene location (Mouse)
Chr.	Chromosome 3 (mouse)
Band	3|3 F1	Start	89,361,848 bp
Band	3|3 F1	End	89,376,320 bp
RNA expression pattern
Bgee	Human / Mouse (ortholog); Top expressed in: apex of heart; right lobe of liver; anterior pituitary; nucleus accumbens; C1 segment; skin of abdomen; anterior cingulate cortex; skin of leg; right adrenal cortex; right auricle of heart / Top expressed in: fossa; lip; condyle; motor neuron; facial motor nucleus; trigeminal ganglion; ectoderm; otic placode; supraoptic nucleus; otic vesicle; More reference expression data
BioGPS	n/a
Gene ontology
Molecular function	transferase activity; nucleotide binding; ATP binding; kinase activity; phosphomevalonate kinase activity
Cellular component	cytoplasm; cytosol; peroxisome; extracellular exosome; membrane
Biological process	cholesterol biosynthetic process; steroid metabolic process; isopentenyl diphosphate biosynthetic process, mevalonate pathway; response to cholesterol; cholesterol metabolic process; sterol biosynthetic process; isoprenoid biosynthetic process; phosphorylation; lipid metabolism; steroid biosynthetic process; regulation of cholesterol biosynthetic process
Sources:Amigo / QuickGO
Orthologs
Databases	NCBI: entry; OMA: entry
Species	Human	Mouse
Entrez	10654	68603
Ensembl	ENSG00000163344	ENSMUSG00000027952
UniProt	Q15126	Q9D1G2
RefSeq (mRNA)	NM_006556; NM_001323011; NM_001323012; NM_001348696	NM_026784; NM_027348; NM_001310640
RefSeq (protein)	NP_001309940; NP_001309941; NP_006547; NP_001335625	NP_001297569; NP_081060; NP_081624
Location (UCSC)	Chr 1: 154.92 – 154.94 Mb	Chr 3: 89.36 – 89.38 Mb
PubMed search
- Wikidata
View/Edit Human	View/Edit Mouse

Phosphomevalonate kinase

Identifiers
- EC no.: 2.7.4.2
- CAS no.: 9026-46-4

Databases
- BRENDA: enzyme data
- ExPASy: NiceZyme view
- KEGG: enzyme entry
- MetaCyc: metabolic pathway
- Rhea: reactions
- PDB structures: RCSB PDB PDBe PDBsum
Search
- PMC: articles
- PubMed: articles
- NCBI: proteins

Phosphomevalonate kinase

Identifiers
- Symbol: PMVK
- NCBI gene: 10654
- HGNC: 9141
- OMIM: 607622
- RefSeq: NM_006556
- UniProt: Q15126

Other data
- EC number: 2.7.4.2
- Locus: Chr. 1 p13-q23
Search for
- Structures: Swiss-model
- Domains: InterPro

Phosphomevalonate kinase is an enzyme (EC 2.7.4.2) in the mevalonate pathway that in humans is encoded by the PMVK gene.

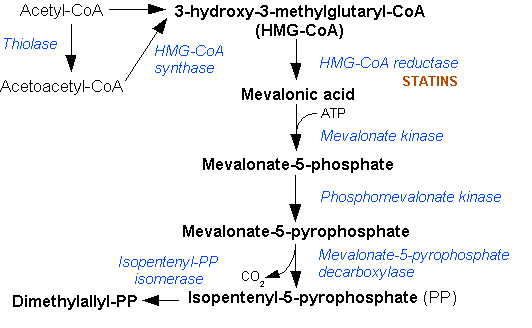
Mevalonate pathway
