= Leloir pathway =

Metabolic pathway for the catabolism of D-galactose

The Leloir pathway is a metabolic pathway for the catabolism of D-galactose. It is named after Luis Federico Leloir, who first described it.

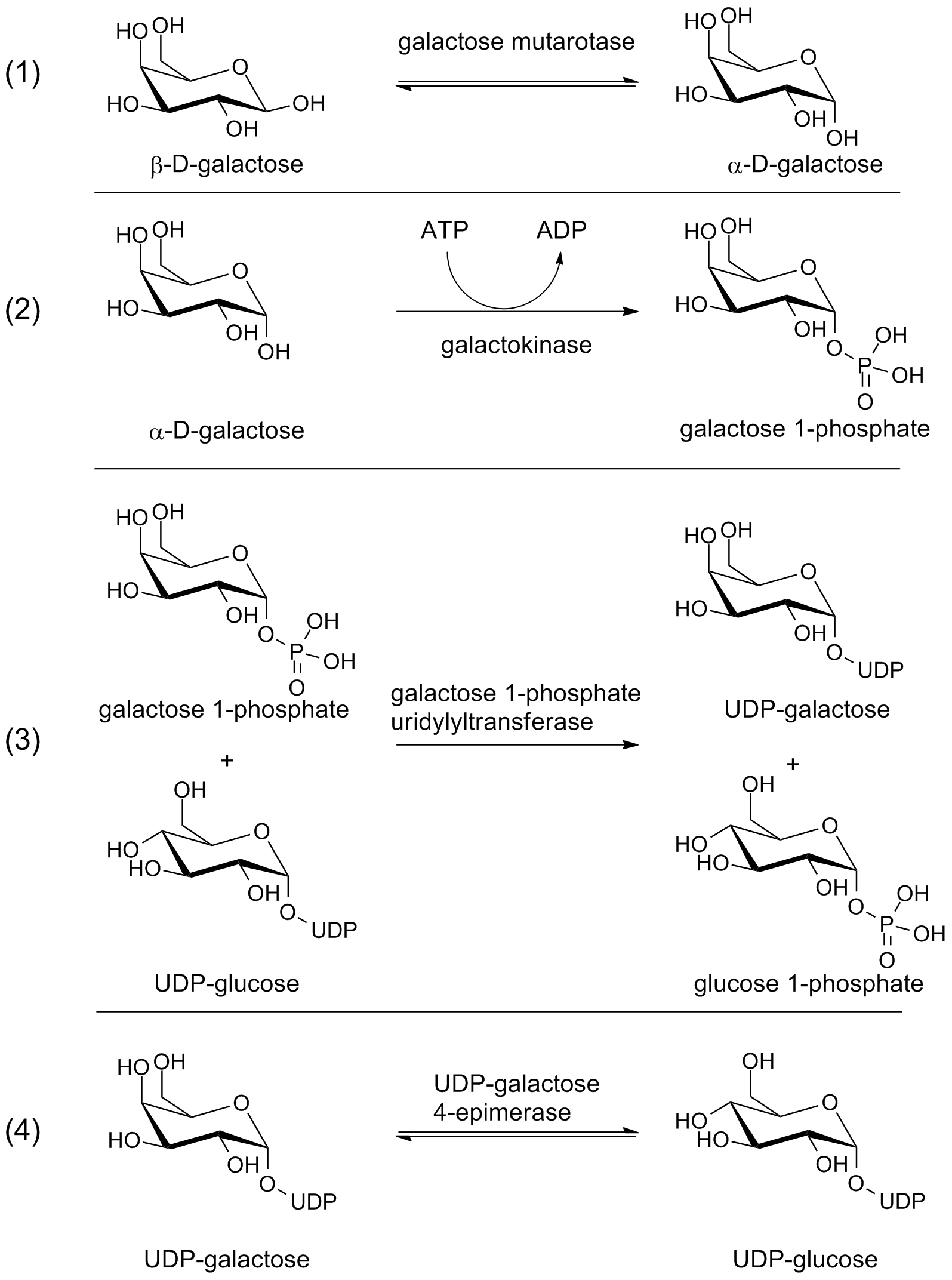
Intermediates and enzymes in the Leloir pathway of galactose metabolism

In the first step, galactose mutarotase facilitates the conversion of β-D-galactose to α-D-galactose since this is the active form in the pathway. Next, α-D-galactose is phosphorylated by galactokinase to galactose 1-phosphate. In the third step, D-galactose-1-phosphate uridylyltransferase converts galactose 1-phosphate to UDP-galactose using UDP-glucose as the uridine diphosphate source. Finally, UDP-galactose 4-epimerase recycles the UDP-galactose to UDP-glucose for the transferase reaction. Additionally, phosphoglucomutase converts the D-glucose 1-phosphate to D-glucose 6-phosphate.

== See also ==
- Anomer
- Mutarotation
- Epimer
  - Epimerase
