= Galactose mutarotase =

Protein-coding gene in the species Homo sapiens

GALM
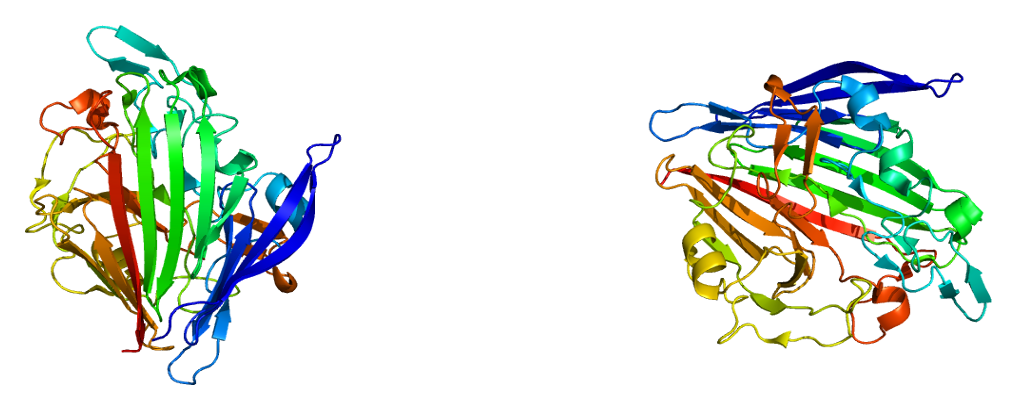

Identifiers
- Aliases: GALM, BLOCK25, GLAT, HEL-S-63p, IBD1, galactose mutarotase (aldose 1-epimerase), galactose mutarotase, GALAC4
- External IDs: OMIM: 137030; MGI: 2442420; GeneCards: GALM
Available structures
PDB	Ortholog search: PDBe RCSB
PDB	List of PDB id codes 1SNZ, 1SO0
Enzyme activity
EC #	BRENDA	ExPASy	KEGG	MetaCyc
5.1.3.3	↗	↗	↗	↗

Gene location (Human)
Chr.	Chromosome 2 (human)
Band	2p22.1	Start	38,666,081 bp
Band	2p22.1	End	38,741,237 bp

Gene location (Mouse)
Chr.	Chromosome 17 (mouse)
Band	17|17 E3	Start	80,434,900 bp
Band	17|17 E3	End	80,492,530 bp
RNA expression pattern
Bgee	Human / Mouse (ortholog); Top expressed in: right adrenal gland; right adrenal cortex; pancreatic ductal cell; left adrenal gland; left adrenal cortex; duodenum; right uterine tube; renal medulla; jejunal mucosa; human kidney / Top expressed in: olfactory epithelium; lacrimal gland; vestibular membrane of cochlear duct; left lobe of liver; epithelium of stomach; jejunum; gallbladder; right kidney; primary oocyte; superior surface of tongue; More reference expression data
BioGPS	n/a
Gene ontology
Molecular function	isomerase activity; aldose 1-epimerase activity; carbohydrate binding; catalytic activity
Cellular component	extracellular exosome; cytoplasm
Biological process	hexose metabolic process; glucose metabolic process; galactose metabolic process; galactose catabolic process via UDP-galactose; carbohydrate metabolic process
Sources:Amigo / QuickGO
Orthologs
Databases	NCBI: entry; OMA: entry
Species	Human	Mouse
Entrez	130589	319625
Ensembl	ENSG00000143891	ENSMUSG00000035473
UniProt	Q96C23	Q8K157
RefSeq (mRNA)	NM_138801	NM_176963
RefSeq (protein)	NP_620156	NP_795937
Location (UCSC)	Chr 2: 38.67 – 38.74 Mb	Chr 17: 80.43 – 80.49 Mb
PubMed search
- Wikidata
View/Edit Human	View/Edit Mouse

Galactose mutarotase (aldose 1-epimerase) (gene name GALM) is a human enzyme that reversibly converts α-aldose to the β-anomer. This enzyme catalyzes the first step of the Leloir pathway, which is involved in galactose metabolism. It belongs to family of aldose epimerases.

The two main amino acids in the enzyme active site are Glu 304, which acts as a Bronsted-Lowry base and removes a proton, and His 170, which acts as Bronsted-Lowry Acid and donates a proton to the galactose.
