= Galactose =

Monosaccharide sugar

d-Galactose
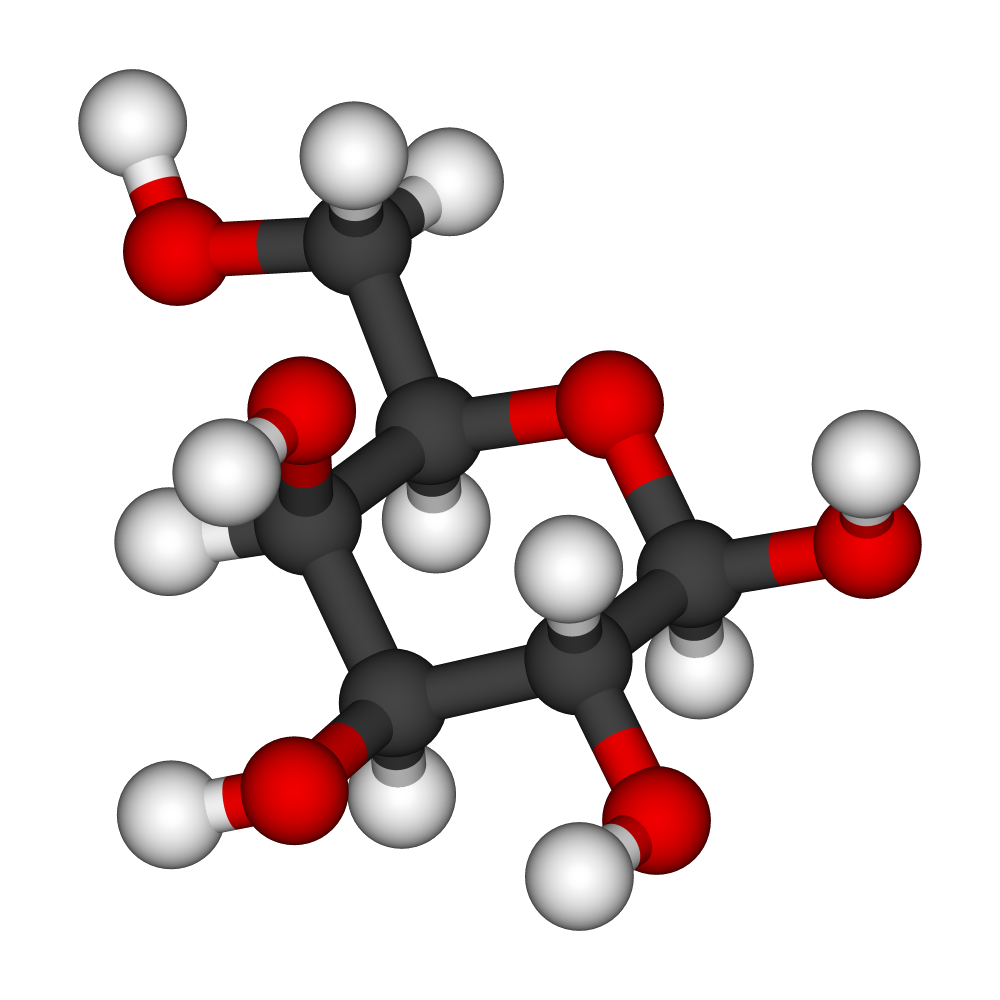

Haworth projection of
β-d-galactopyranose
Fischer projection of
d-galactose

Names
- IUPAC names Galactose galacto-Hexose
- Systematic IUPAC name (2R,3S,4S,5R,6)-2,3,4,5,6-Pentahydroxyhexanal
- Other names Brain sugar

Identifiers
| CAS Number | 59-23-4 |
| 3D model (JSmol) | Interactive image |
| Beilstein Reference | 1724619 |
| ChEBI | CHEBI:28061 |
| ChEMBL | ChEMBL300520 |
| ChemSpider | 388480 |
| IUPHAR/BPS | 4646 |
| KEGG | D04291 |
| MeSH | Galactose |
| PubChem CID | 439357 |
| UNII | X2RN3Q8DNE |
- InChI: InChI=1S/C6H12O6/c7-1-2-3(8)4(9)5(10)6(11)12-2/h2-11H,1H2/t2−,3+,4+,5−,6+/m1/s1 Key: WQZGKKKJIJFFOK-PHYPRBDBSA-N; InChI=1/C6H12O6/c7-1-2-3(8)4(9)5(10)6(11)12-2/h2-11H,1H2/t2−,3+,4+,5−,6+/m1/s1 Key: WQZGKKKJIJFFOK-PHYPRBDBBU
- SMILES: O[C@H]1[C@@H](O)[C@H](O[C@H](O)[C@@H]1O)CO

Properties
| Chemical formula | C_{6}H_{12}O_{6} |
| Molar mass | 180.156 g·mol^{−1} |
| Appearance | White solid |
| Odor | Odorless |
| Density | 1.5 g/cm^{3} |
| Melting point | 168–170 °C (334–338 °F; 441–443 K) |
| Solubility in water | 650 g/L (20 °C) |
| Magnetic susceptibility (χ) | −103.00·10^{−6} cm^{3}/mol |

Pharmacology
| ATC code | V04CE01 (WHO) V08DA02 (WHO) (microparticles) |

Hazards
| NFPA 704 (fire diamond) | 1 0 0 |
- Except where otherwise noted, data are given for materials in their standard state (at 25 °C [77 °F], 100 kPa). verify (what is ?) Infobox references

Galactose (/ɡəˈlæktoʊs/, galacto- + -ose, sometimes abbreviated gal) is a common monosaccharide, i.e. a simple sugar. It is classified as a reducing hexose, more specifically an aldohexose. In terms of structure, it is a C-4 epimer of glucose. A white, water-soluble solid, it is about 80–90% as sweet as glucose and about 65% as sweet as sucrose.

== Occurrence ==
Galactan is a polymeric form of galactose found in hemicellulose, and forming the core of the galactans, a class of natural polymeric carbohydrates.

D-galactose is also known as brain sugar since it is a component of glycoproteins (oligosaccharide-protein compounds) found in nerve tissue. Galactofuranose occurs in bacteria, fungi and protozoa, and is recognized by a putative chordate immune lectin intelectin through its exocyclic 1,2-diol.

=== Relationship to lactose ===
Galactose, when combined with glucose (another monosaccharide) through a condensation reaction, gives the disaccharide called lactose. The hydrolysis of lactose to glucose and galactose is catalyzed by the enzymes lactase and β-galactosidase. The latter is produced by the lac operon in Escherichia coli.

In nature, lactose is found primarily in milk and milk products. Consequently, various food products made with dairy-derived ingredients can contain lactose. Galactose is metabolised to glucose by the three principal enzymes in a mechanism known as the Leloir pathway. The enzymes are listed in the order of the metabolic pathway: galactokinase (GALK), galactose-1-phosphate uridyltransferase (GALT), and UDP-galactose 4′-epimerase (GALE).

In human lactation, galactose is required in a 1 to 1 ratio with glucose to enable the mammary glands to synthesize and secrete lactose. In a study where women were fed a diet containing galactose, 69 ± 6% of glucose and 54 ± 4% of galactose in the lactose they produced were derived directly from plasma glucose, while 7 ± 2% of the glucose and 12 ± 2% of the galactose in the lactose, were derived directly from plasma galactose. 25 ± 8% of the glucose and 35 ± 6% of the galactose was synthesized from smaller molecules in a process referred to in the paper as hexoneogenesis. This suggests that the synthesis of galactose is supplemented by direct uptake and the use of plasma galactose when present.

== Structure and isomerism ==
Cyclic forms of galactose

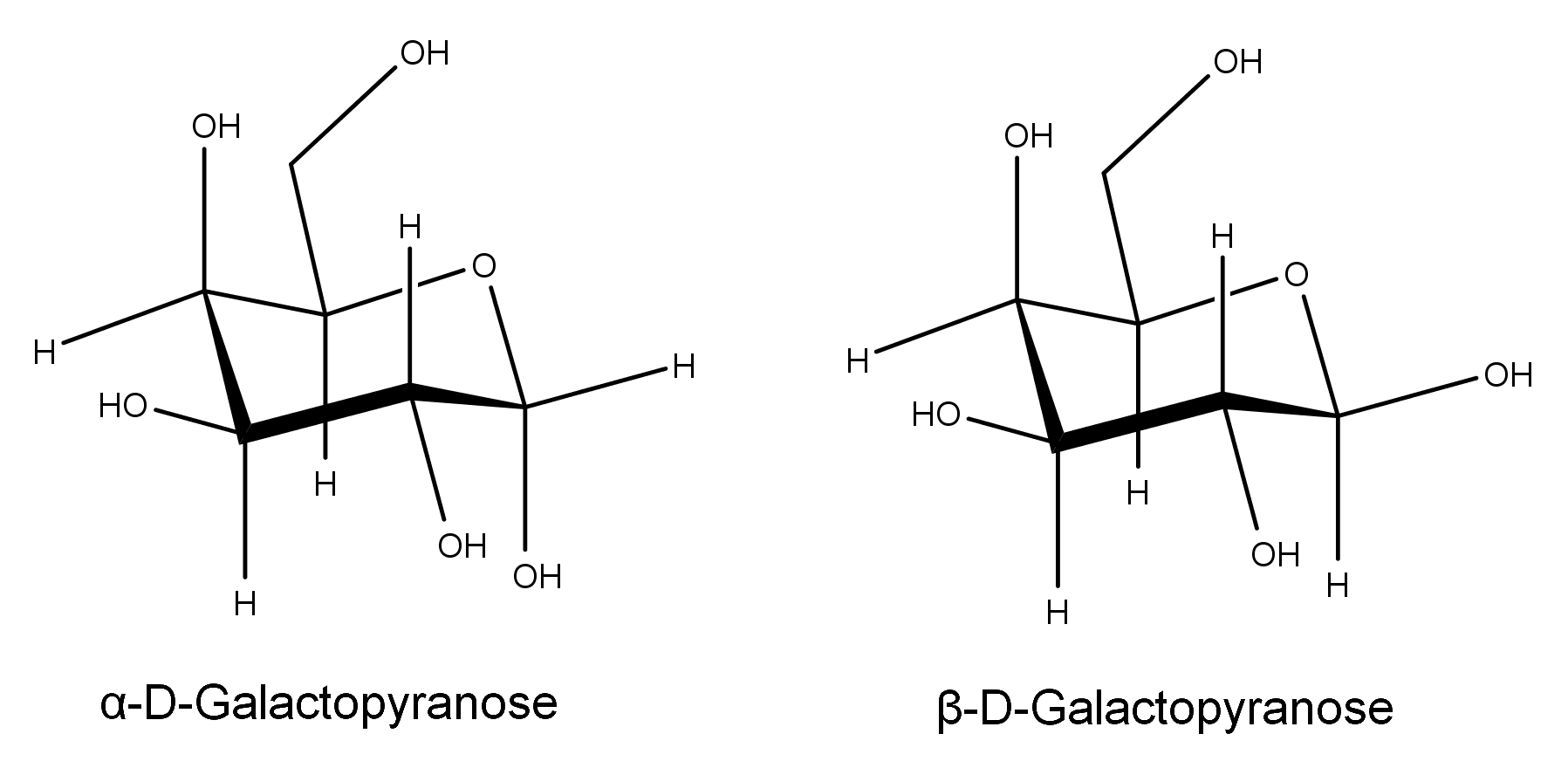
Chair conformation of D-galactopyranose

Galactose exists in both open-chain and cyclic form. The open-chain form is an aldehyde (RCHO).

Four isomers are cyclic, two of them with a pyranose (six-membered) ring and two with a furanose (five-membered) ring. Each cyclic form can exist as two anomers, named alpha and beta, since a new stereocenter is generated upon cyclization at the site of the carbonyl. In the pyranose form, the OH group on C-3 is axial.

== Metabolism ==
Metabolism of common monosaccharides and some biochemical reactions of glucose

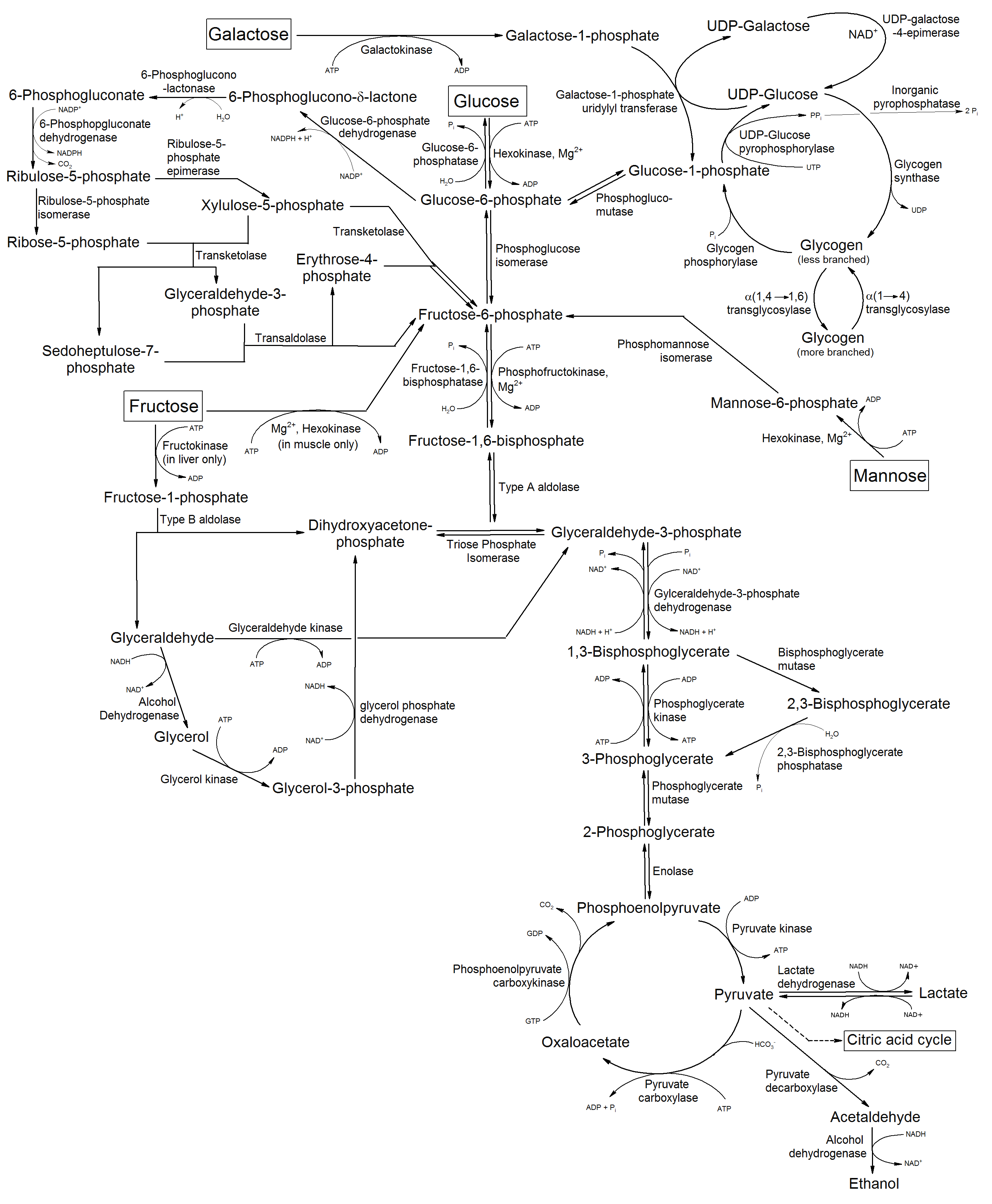

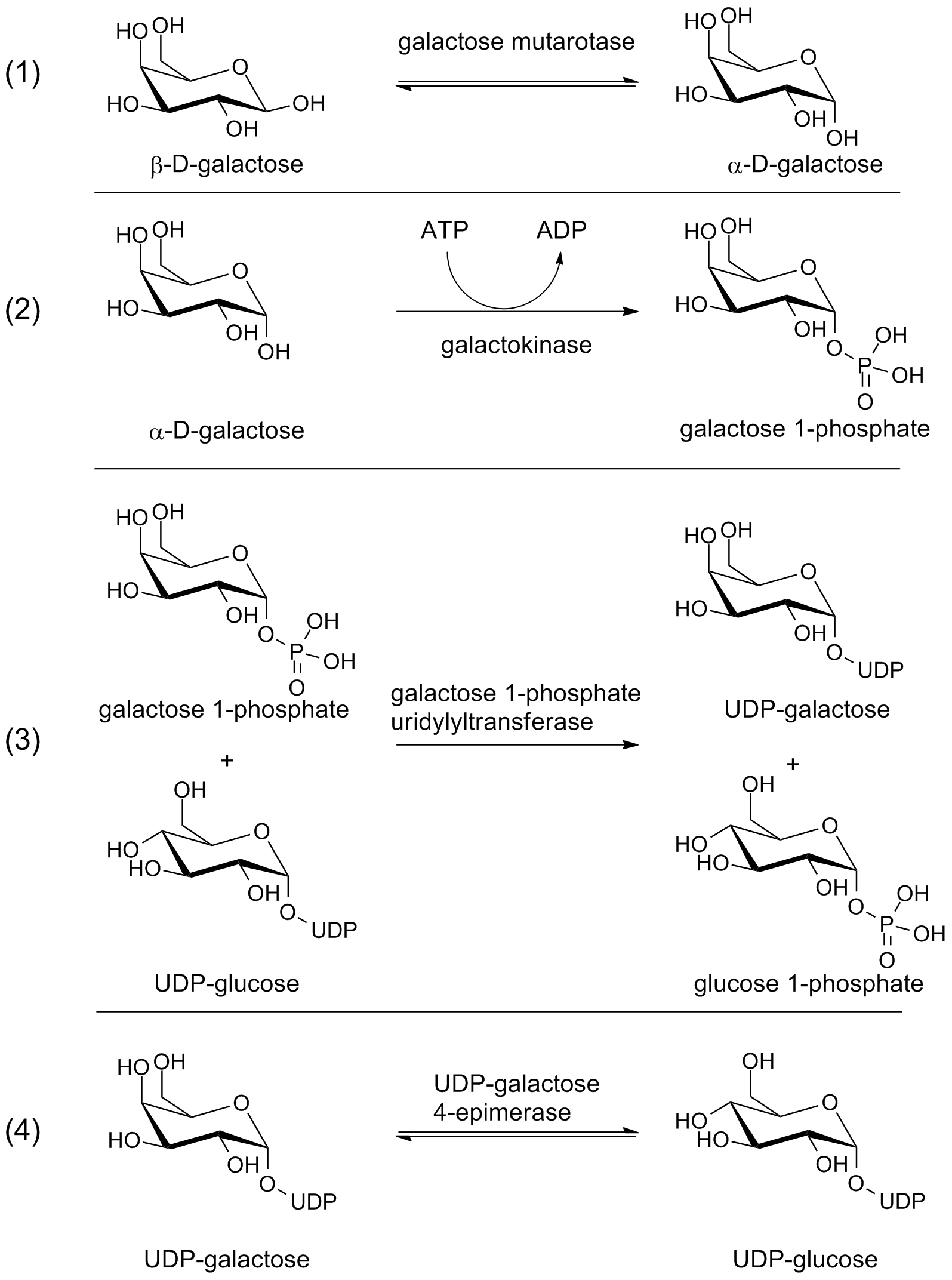
Galactose metabolism

Glucose is more stable than galactose and is less susceptible to the formation of nonspecific glycoconjugates, molecules with at least one sugar attached to a protein or lipid. Many speculate that it is for this reason that a pathway for rapid conversion from galactose to glucose has been highly conserved among many species.

The main pathway of galactose metabolism is the Leloir pathway; humans and other species, however, have been noted to contain several alternate pathways, such as the De Ley Doudoroff Pathway. The Leloir pathway consists of the latter stage of a two-part process that converts β-D-galactose to UDP-glucose. The initial stage is the conversion of β-D-galactose to α-D-galactose by the enzyme, mutarotase (GALM). The Leloir pathway then carries out the conversion of α-D-galactose to UDP-glucose via three principal enzymes: Galactokinase (GALK) phosphorylates α-D-galactose to galactose-1-phosphate, or Gal-1-P; Galactose-1-phosphate uridyltransferase (GALT) transfers a UMP group from UDP-glucose to Gal-1-P to form UDP-galactose; and finally, UDP galactose-4'-epimerase (GALE) interconverts UDP-galactose and UDP-glucose, thereby completing the pathway.

The above mechanisms for galactose metabolism are necessary because the human body cannot directly use galactose for energy metabolism, and it must first go through one of these processes.

Galactosemia is an inability to properly break down galactose due to a genetically inherited mutation in one of the enzymes in the Leloir pathway. As a result, the consumption of even small quantities is harmful to galactosemics.

== Sources ==
Galactose is found in dairy products, avocados, sugar beets, other gums and mucilages. It is also synthesized by the body, where it forms part of glycolipids and glycoproteins in several tissues; and is a by-product from the third-generation ethanol production process (from macroalgae).

== Clinical significance ==
Chronic systemic exposure of mice, rats, and Drosophila to D-galactose causes the acceleration of senescence (aging). It has been reported that high dose exposure of D-galactose (120 mg/kg) can cause reduced sperm concentration and sperm motility in rodents and has been extensively used as an aging model when administered subcutaneously. Two studies have suggested a possible link between galactose in milk and ovarian cancer. Other studies show no correlation, even in the presence of defective galactose metabolism. More recently, pooled analysis done by the Harvard School of Public Health showed no specific correlation between lactose-containing foods and ovarian cancer, and showed statistically insignificant increases in risk for consumption of lactose at 30 g/day. More research is necessary to ascertain possible risks.

Some ongoing studies suggest galactose may have a role in treatment of focal segmental glomerulosclerosis (a kidney disease resulting in kidney failure and proteinuria). This effect is likely to be a result of binding of galactose to FSGS factor.

Some studies have pointed out that Trypanosoma cruzi, the etiologic agent of Chagas disease, exhibits more resistance against hydrogen peroxide when galactose is used as a source of energy and carbons by this parasite.

Galactose is a component of the antigens (chemical markers) present on blood cells that distinguish blood type within the ABO blood group system. In O and A antigens, there are two monomers of galactose on the antigens, whereas in the B antigens there are three monomers of galactose.

A disaccharide composed of two units of galactose, galactose-alpha-1,3-galactose (alpha-gal), has been recognized as a potential allergen present in mammal meat. Alpha-gal allergy may be triggered by lone star tick bites.

Galactose in sodium saccharin solution has also been found to cause conditioned flavor avoidance in adult female rats within a laboratory setting when combined with intragastric injections. The reason for this flavor avoidance is still unknown. However, a decrease in the levels of the enzymes required to convert galactose to glucose in the liver of the rats could be responsible.

== History ==
In 1855, E. O. Erdmann noted that hydrolysis of lactose produced a substance besides glucose.

Galactose was first isolated and studied by Louis Pasteur in 1856 and he called it "lactose". In 1860, Berthelot renamed it "galactose" or "glucose lactique". In 1894, Emil Fischer and Robert Morrell determined the configuration of galactose.

== Etymology ==
The word galactose is derived from Greek γάλακτος, galaktos 'of milk', and the generic chemical suffix for sugars -ose. The etymology is comparable to that of the word lactose in that both contain roots meaning "milk sugar".

== Spectroscopy ==
The IR spectra for galactose shows a broad, strong stretch from roughly wavenumber 2500 cm^{−1} to wavenumber 3700 cm^{−1}.

The Proton NMR spectra for galactose includes peaks at 4.7 ppm (D_{2}O), 4.15 ppm (−CH_{2}OH), 3.75, 3.61, 3.48 and 3.20 ppm (−CH_{2} of ring), 2.79–1.90 ppm (−OH).

== See also ==
- Galactogen
- Galactolysis
