= Galactose-1-phosphate uridylyltransferase =

Metabolic enzyme which converts galactose into glucose

GALT
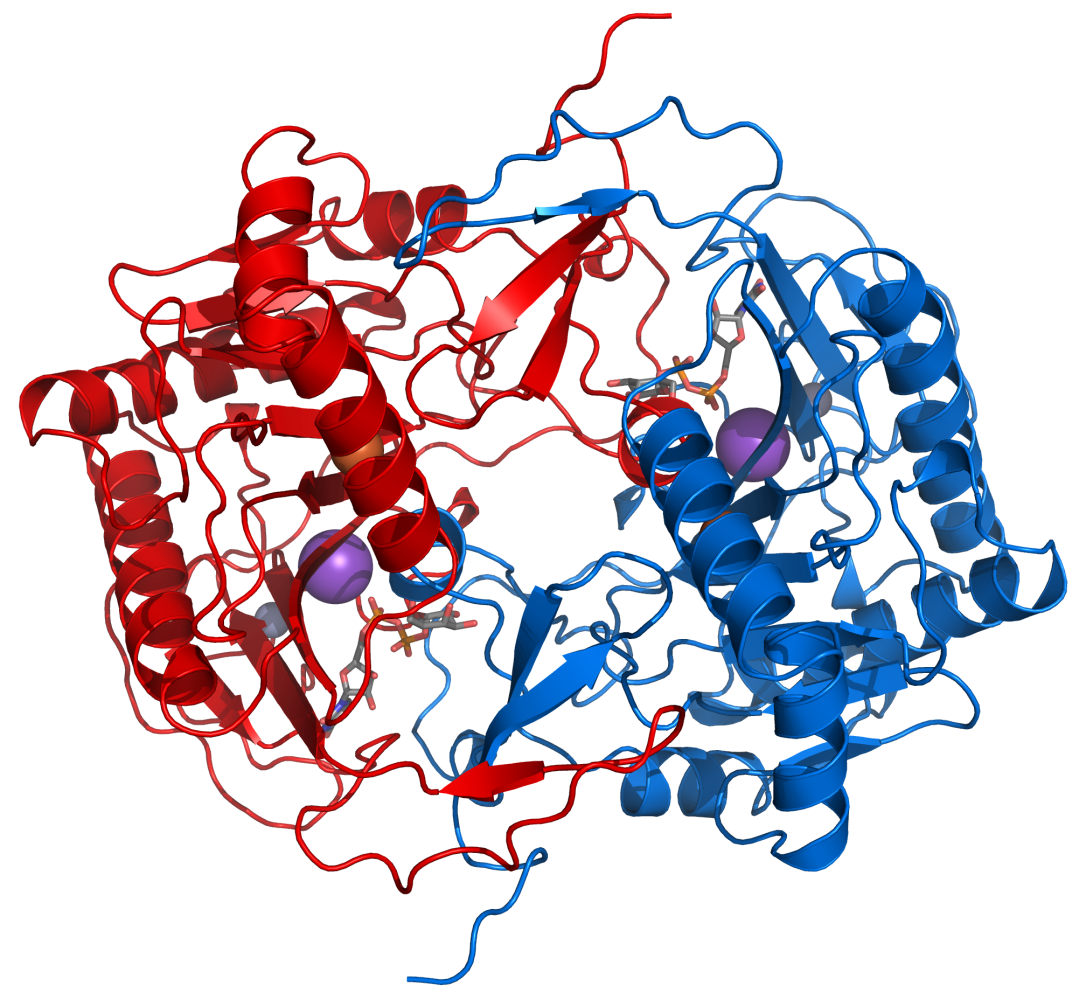

Identifiers
- Aliases: GALT, entrez:2592, galactose-1-phosphate uridylyltransferase
- External IDs: OMIM: 606999; MGI: 95638; GeneCards: GALT
Available structures
PDB	Ortholog search: PDBe RCSB
PDB	List of PDB id codes 5IN3
Enzyme activity
EC #	BRENDA	ExPASy	KEGG	MetaCyc
2.7.7.12	↗	↗	↗	↗

Gene location (Human)
Chr.	Chromosome 9 (human)
Band	9p13.3	Start	34,638,133 bp
Band	9p13.3	End	34,651,035 bp

Gene location (Mouse)
Chr.	Chromosome 4 (mouse)
Band	4 A5|4 22.07 cM	Start	41,755,228 bp
Band	4 A5|4 22.07 cM	End	41,758,695 bp
RNA expression pattern
Bgee	Human / Mouse (ortholog); Top expressed in: right lobe of liver; right adrenal gland; apex of heart; right adrenal cortex; left adrenal cortex; right lobe of thyroid gland; granulocyte; right ovary; anterior pituitary; left lobe of thyroid gland / Top expressed in: superior frontal gyrus; cerebellum; cerebellar cortex; renal cortex; proximal tubule; primary visual cortex; striatum of neuraxis; right kidney; heart; adrenal gland; More reference expression data
BioGPS	n/a
Gene ontology
Molecular function	transferase activity; nucleotidyltransferase activity; protein binding; metal ion binding; UDP-glucose:hexose-1-phosphate uridylyltransferase activity; zinc ion binding
Cellular component	cytosol; Golgi apparatus; cytoplasm
Biological process	UDP-glucose catabolic process; galactose catabolic process; galactose catabolic process via UDP-galactose; UDP-glucose metabolic process; galactose metabolic process; carbohydrate metabolic process
Sources:Amigo / QuickGO
Orthologs
Databases	NCBI: entry; OMA: entry
Species	Human	Mouse
Entrez	2592	14430
Ensembl	ENSG00000213930	ENSMUSG00000036073
UniProt	P07902	Q03249
RefSeq (mRNA)	NM_001258332; NM_000155; NM_147131; NM_147132	NM_016658; NM_001302511
RefSeq (protein)	NP_000146; NP_001245261	NP_001289440; NP_057867; NP_001356064; NP_001356069; NP_001356070 NP_001356071; NP_001356072; NP_001356073; NP_001356076; NP_001382559
Location (UCSC)	Chr 9: 34.64 – 34.65 Mb	Chr 4: 41.76 – 41.76 Mb
PubMed search
- Wikidata
View/Edit Human	View/Edit Mouse

Galactose-1-phosphate uridyl transferase, N-terminal domain

Identifiers
- Symbol: GalP_UDP_transf
- Pfam: PF01087
- Pfam clan: CL0265
- PROSITE: PDOC00108
- SCOP2: 1hxp / SCOPe / SUPFAM
Available protein structures:
- PDB: PF01087 (ECOD; PDBsum)
- AlphaFold: PF01087

Galactose-1-phosphate uridyl transferase, C-terminal domain
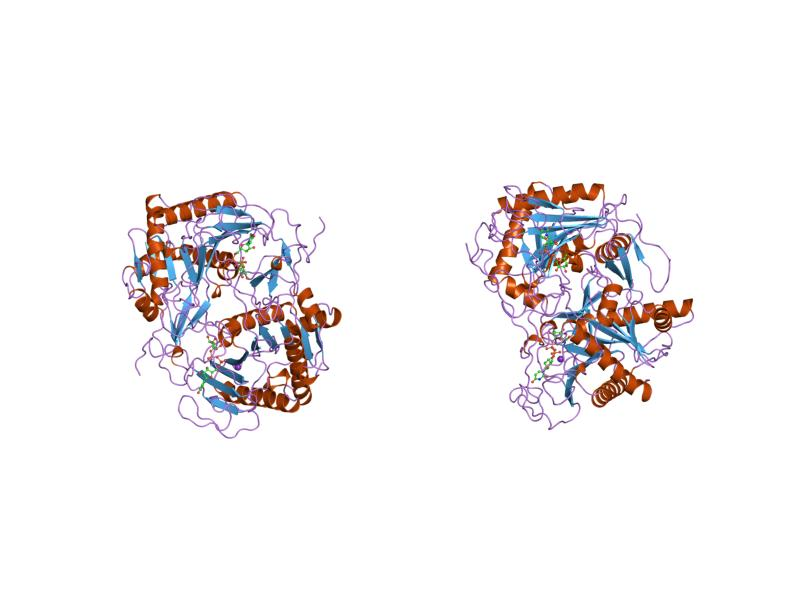
- structure of nucleotidyltransferase complexed with udp-galactose

Identifiers
- Symbol: GalP_UDP_tr_C
- Pfam: PF02744
- Pfam clan: CL0265
- InterPro: IPR005850
- PROSITE: PDOC00108
- SCOP2: 1hxp / SCOPe / SUPFAM
Available protein structures:
- PDB: IPR005850 PF02744 (ECOD; PDBsum)
- AlphaFold: IPR005850; PF02744

Galactose-1-phosphate uridyltransferase (or GALT, G1PUT) is an enzyme (EC 2.7.7.12) responsible for converting ingested galactose to glucose.

Galactose-1-phosphate uridyltransferase (GALT) catalyzes the second step of the Leloir pathway of galactose metabolism, namely:

UDP-glucose +
galactose 1-phosphate
UDP-galactose +
glucose 1-phosphate

The expression of GALT is controlled by the actions of the FOXO3 gene. The absence of this enzyme results in classic galactosemia in humans and can be fatal in the newborn period if lactose is not removed from the diet. The pathophysiology of galactosemia has not been clearly defined.

== Mechanism ==
GALT catalyzes the second reaction of the Leloir pathway of galactose metabolism through ping pong bi-bi kinetics with a double displacement mechanism. This means that the net reaction consists of two reactants and two products (see the reaction above) and it proceeds by the following mechanism: the enzyme reacts with one substrate to generate one product and a modified enzyme, which goes on to react with the second substrate to make the second product while regenerating the original enzyme. In the case of GALT, the His166 residue acts as a potent nucleophile to facilitate transfer of a nucleotide between UDP-hexoses and hexose-1-phosphates.

1. UDP-glucose + E-His ⇌ Glucose-1-phosphate + E-His-UMP
2. Galactose-1-phosphate + E-His-UMP ⇌ UDP-galactose + E-His

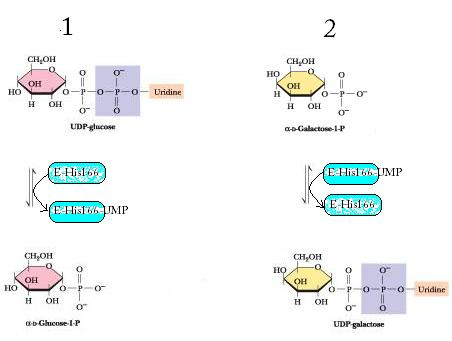
Two-step action of galactose-1-phosphate uridylyltransferase. Image adapted from

== Structural studies ==
The three-dimensional structure at 180 pm resolution (x-ray crystallography) of GALT was determined by Wedekind, Frey, and Rayment, and their structural analysis found key amino acids essential for GALT function. Among these are Leu4, Phe75, Asn77, Asp78, Phe79, and Val108, which are consistent with residues that have been implicated both in point mutation experiments as well as in clinical screening that play a role in human galactosemia.

GALT also has minimal (~0.1%) GalNAc transferase activity. X-ray crystallography revealed that the side chain of Tyr289 forms a hydrogen bond with the N-acetyl group of UDP-GalNAc. Point mutation of residue Tyr289 to Leu, Ile, or Asn eliminates this interaction, enhancing GalNAc transferase activity, with the Y289L mutation showing comparable GalNAc transferase activity as the wild-type enzyme's Gal transferase activity.

== Clinical significance ==
Deficiency of GALT causes classic galactosemia. Galactosemia is an autosomal recessive inherited disorder detectable in newborns and childhood. It occurs at approximately 1 in every 40,000-60,000 live-born infants. Classical galactosemia (G/G) is caused by a deficiency in GALT activity, whereas the more common clinical manifestations, Duarte (D/D) and the Duarte/Classical variant (D/G) are caused by the attenuation of GALT activity. Symptoms include ovarian failure, developmental coordination disorder (difficulty speaking correctly and consistently), and neurologic deficits. A single mutation in any of several base pairs can lead to deficiency in GALT activity. For example, a single mutation from A to G in exon 6 of the GALT gene changes Glu188 to an arginine and a mutation from A to G in exon 10 converts Asn314 to an aspartic acid. These two mutations also add new restriction enzyme cut sites, which enable detection by and large-scale population screening with PCR (polymerase chain reaction). Screening has mostly eliminated neonatal death by G/G galactosemia, but the disease, due to GALT’s role in the biochemical metabolism of ingested galactose (which is toxic when accumulated) to the energetically useful glucose, can certainly be fatal. However, those afflicted with galactosemia can live relatively normal lives by avoiding milk products and anything else containing galactose (because it cannot be metabolized), but there is still the potential for problems in neurological development or other complications, even in those who avoid galactose.

== Disease database ==
Galactosemia (GALT) Mutation Database
